= Port Jersey =

Freight terminal on Upper New York Bay

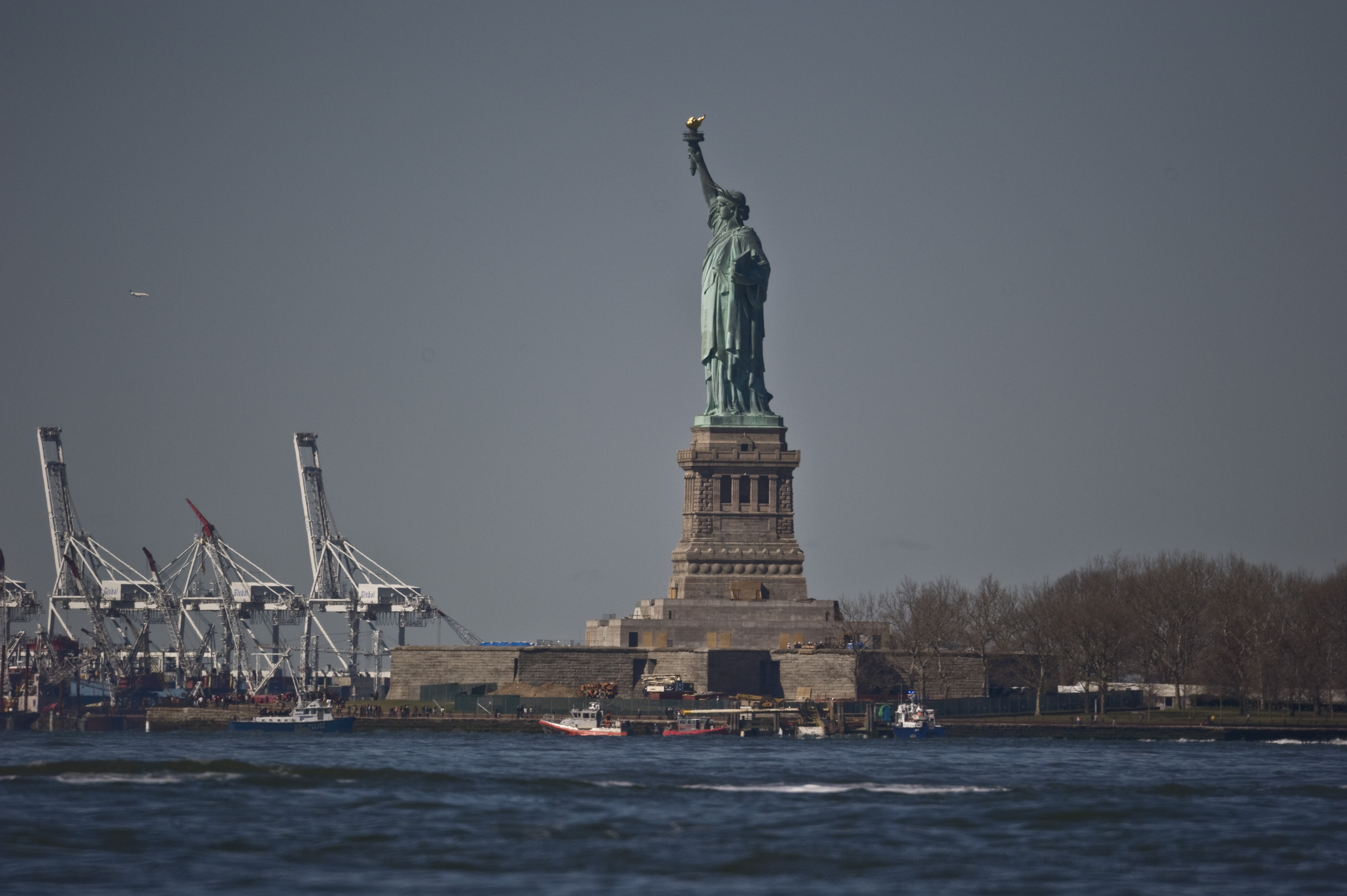
- Port Jersey, with the Statue of Liberty in the foreground
- Type: Intermodal freight transport facility
- Location: Bayonne & Jersey City; New Jersey
- Coordinates: 40.671°N 74.074°W
- Official name: Port Jersey Port Authority Marine Terminal
- Owner: Port Authority of New York and New Jersey
- Operator: Port Authority of New York and New Jersey; New York New Jersey Rail, LLC; Conrail Shared Assets Operations; Port Liberty Bayonne (CMA CGM)

Characteristics
- Clearance below: 50 feet (15 m)

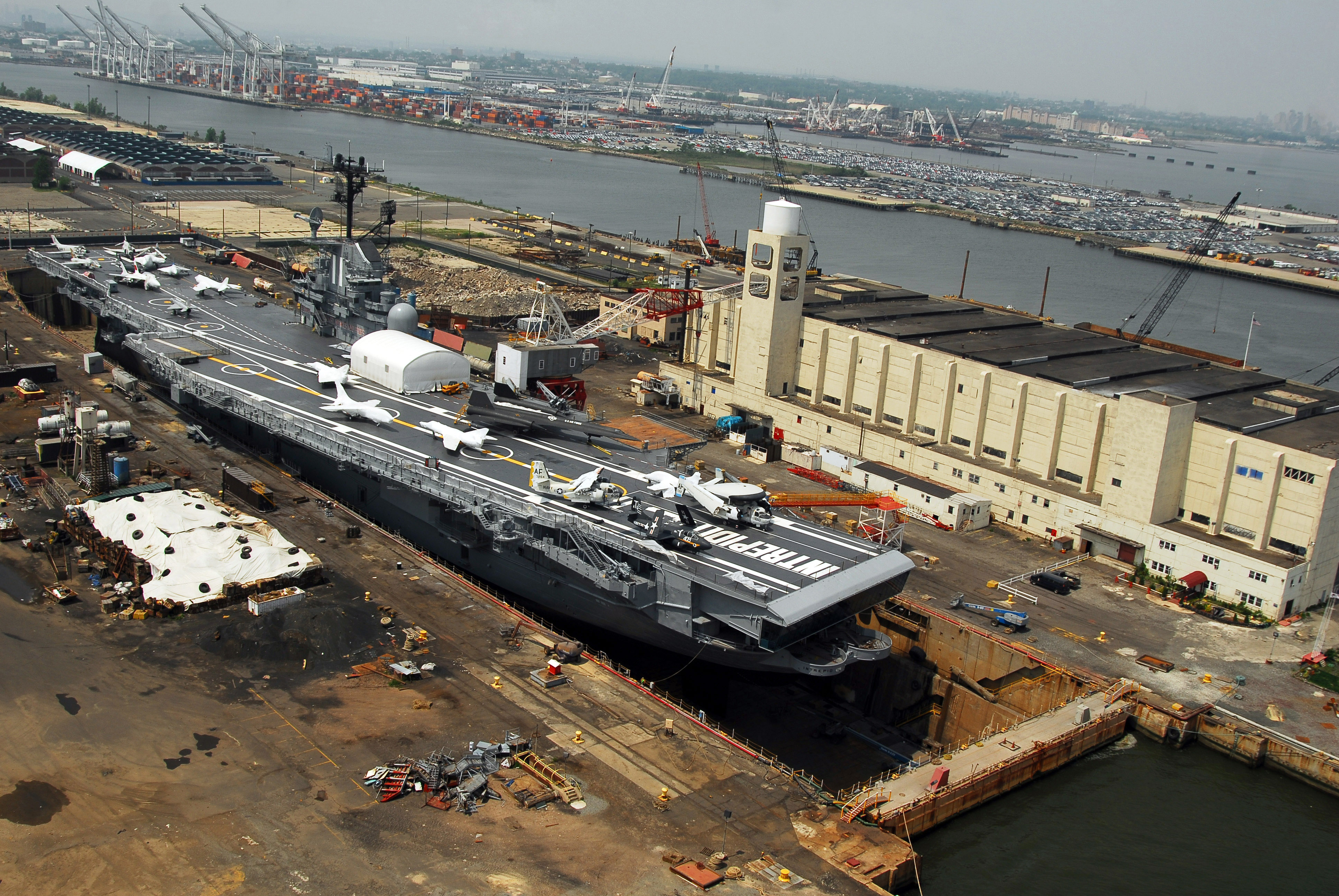
Looking northwest across MOTBY (with USS Intrepid in foreground), Port Jersey, Greenville Yard, and Claremont Terminal

Port Jersey, officially the Port Jersey Port Authority Marine Terminal and referred to as the Port Jersey Marine Terminal, is an intermodal freight transport facility that includes a container terminal located on the Upper New York Bay in the Port of New York and New Jersey. The municipal border of the Hudson County cities of Jersey City and Bayonne runs along the long pier extending into the bay.

The facility was created between 1972 and 1976 and acquired by the Port Authority of New York and New Jersey in July 2010. CMA CGM operates a post-panamax shipping facility at this terminal under the name Port Liberty Bayonne.

Much of Port Jersey is part of United States Foreign-Trade Zone 49. Most of the area in and around the facility is restricted, though a walkway along its northern side is accessible to the general public and may eventually connect with the Hudson River Waterfront Walkway. A very small bird sanctuary (specifically for the least tern) is also located on the promenade.

== History ==
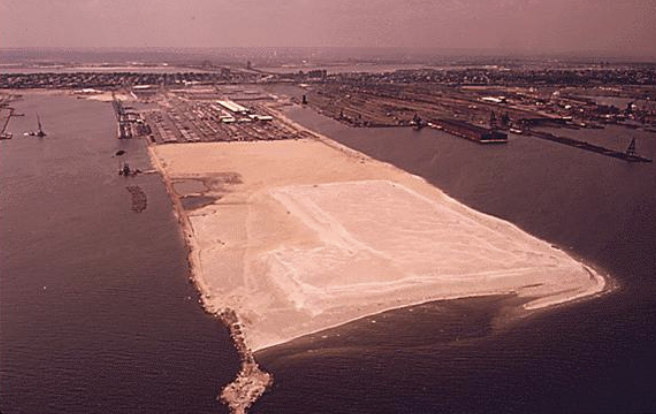
Landfill in 1974 that would become part of Port Jersey

The area, east of the Greenville section of Jersey City was originally tidal marshes and white cedar swamps, and was first used for industrial purposes beginning in the 1800s.

The pier that become Port Jersey was created in the between 1972 and 1976 using landfill.

The facility was once known as the NorthEast Auto Terminal (NEAT) and was operated as a private auto import and export facility for several decades before its purchase in 2008 by the Port Authority of New York and New Jersey. The location of the PA Auto Marine Terminal and its relatively airdraft-free deepwater access for larger vessels led to the PANYNJ to convert the facility into a container terminal. Anticipating the needs of the planned and existing super-panamax containerships which will call in the port upon the completion of the new Panama Canal Megalocks, NEAT was incrementally shut down and its share of the auto import/export market completely transferred to the Bayonne Auto Terminal and the Port Newark FAPS facility by 2011.

After the PANYNJ purchase, the container terminal facilities were expanded in conjunction with the former operator of the terminal, Global Terminals.

The largest ship ever to call at the Port of New York-New Jersey, the MOL Benefactor, docked at Port Jersey in July 2016 after sailing from China through the newly widened Panama Canal.

In July 2024, Liebherr upgraded four cranes at the port by raising them 28.2 feet (8.6 m) and extending their reach by 16 feet (4.9 m) to accommodate larger cargo ships. In October, Port Jersey received four new super post panamax cranes capable of serving 24,000 twenty-foot equivalent unit (TEU) vessels raising the number of cranes at the port from eight to twelve. Additionally, a third berth for vessels with a depth of 55 feet (17 m) was constructed.

== Channels ==
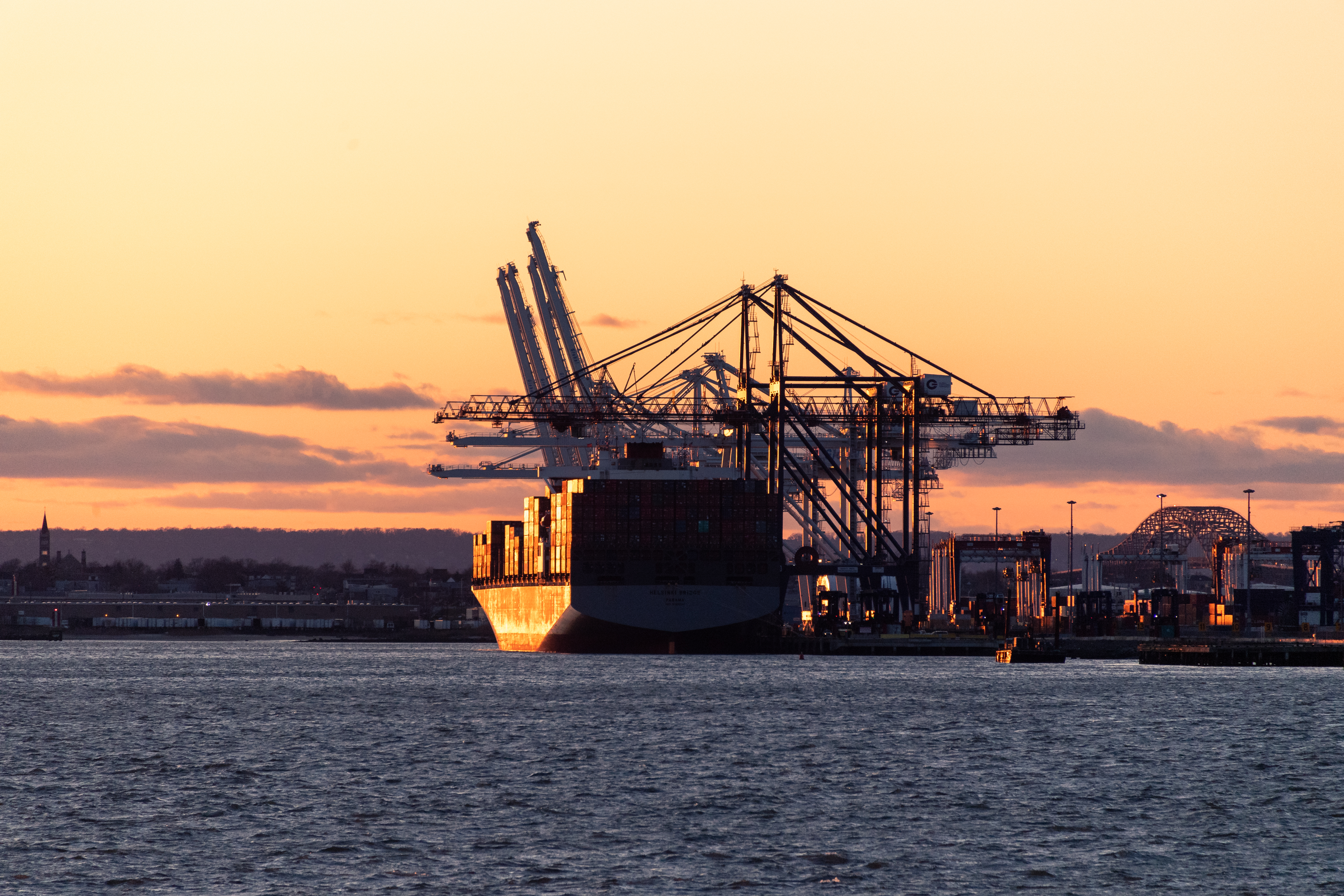

Ambrose Channel is the main shipping channel in and out of the Port of New York and New Jersey. Branching canal to the south the Port Jersey Channel separates the pier from the peninsula pier of a former military base, Military Ocean Terminal at Bayonne (MOTBY). The a multi-use area is home to the Cape Liberty Cruise Port (one of the New York metropolitan area's three cruise ship terminals), residential and commercial buildings, and land owned by the PANYNJ to be further developed as port facilities. Deepening of the Port Jersey Channel to 50 feet (15 m) was authorized by the Army Corps of Engineers in 2010. and completed in 2016. To the north lies Claremeont Terminal.

== Rail ==
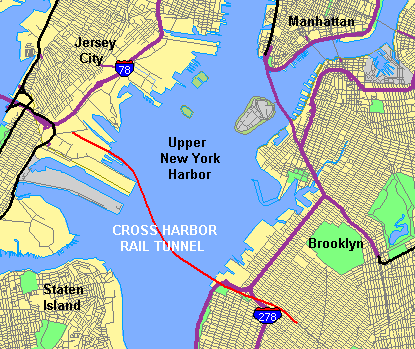
The route of a proposed Cross-Harbor Rail Tunnel across the Upper New York Bay. Port Jersey is the upper of two man-made piers extending into the bay, the lower being MOTBY

Port Jersey is one of the few areas on the Bergen Neck peninsula where freight rail lines are still in use. In October 2010 the PANYNJ announced plans to develop ExpressRail Port Jersey, allowing for more transfers to trains, and thus reducing transfers to trucks. Trains will use a renovated National Docks Secondary freight line to access the national network, part of the Liberty Freight Corridor. In December 2016, construction began on the $600 million Express Rail facility. The facility features 9,600 feet of track serviced by rail mounted gantry cranes that will have an annual capacity of 250,000 container lifts. Construction was scheduled to be completed by mid-2018. The first phase of the project, with four tracks and two gantry cranes, opened on January 7, 2019. The second and final phase of the project, with four additional tracks bringing the total number of tracks to eight, was opened on June 17, 2019.

Improvements were also made to New York New Jersey Rail, a switching and terminal railroad that operates the only car float in New York Harbor between Jersey City and Brooklyn. In 2017, a new barge, NYNJR100, was delivered that features four tracks that can carry up to 18 rail cars of 60-foot (18 m) length, with up to 2,298 long tons (2,335 tonne) of cargo. A second barge with the same capacity, NYNJR200, was delivered in 2018 with an older 14-car barge, the 278, still in service.

== Road ==
Port Jersey is served by New Jersey Route 440 which connects with the Bayonne Bridge to Staten Island. The Port is primarily accessed by Exit 14A of the Newark Bay Extension of the New Jersey Turnpike, which underwent a $172 million reconstruction and expansion in 2018 to ease congestion for truckers and commuters. New Jersey Route 185 connects the facility to Greenville Yard.

== Wind turbines ==
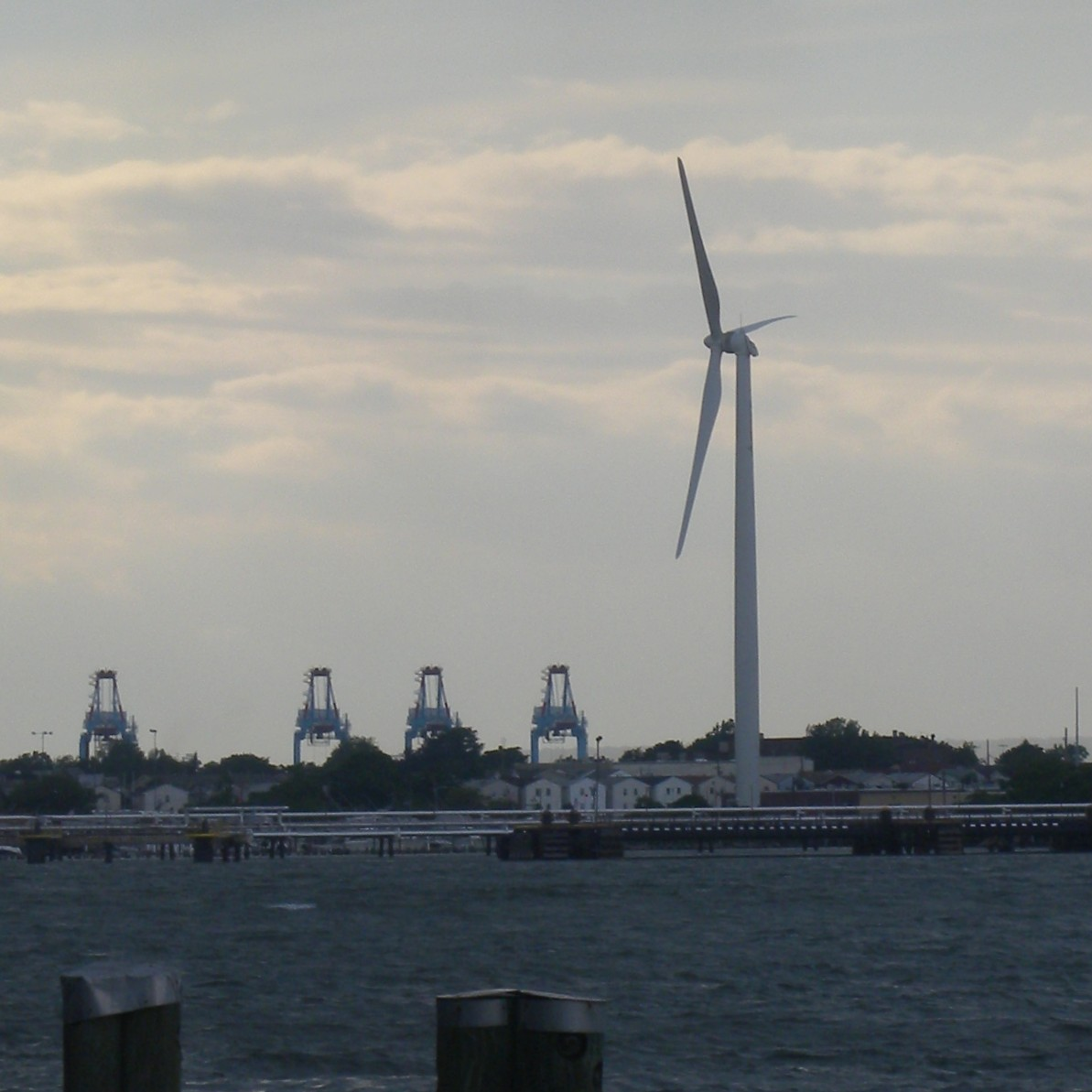

In 2010 the Port Authority of New York and New Jersey announced its intentions to build a five tower wind farm at Port Jersey within three years. The windfarm is part of a larger plan to expand the container port on the manmade peninsula to accommodate post-panamax ships. In May 2012, Global Container Terminals announced detailed plan of the port extension. It included the installation of 9 wind turbines in order to meet a zero emissions footprint of their crane operation during periods of wind power generation. As of mid-2017, this proposal has not seen any meaningful progress.

== Solid waste ==
Port Jersey is the key transload terminal for solid waste from New York City barges to railcars. In 2004, the city announced its plans to minimize haulage of waste by truck. Jersey City benefits from a $10 million initial payment and annual payments of $250,000 for the arrangement. The plan faced opposition initially. In 2010, the plan was approved, with $118 million budgeted by the Port Authority. In 2010, the PANYNJ purchased the yard to begin the project. Waste handling improvement projects have continued in context of other improvements to the Greenville Rail Yard.

== See also ==
- Geography of New York Harbor
- Rail freight transportation in New York City and Long Island
- Wind power in New Jersey
