= Bay Ridge Branch =

Freight rail line in New York City

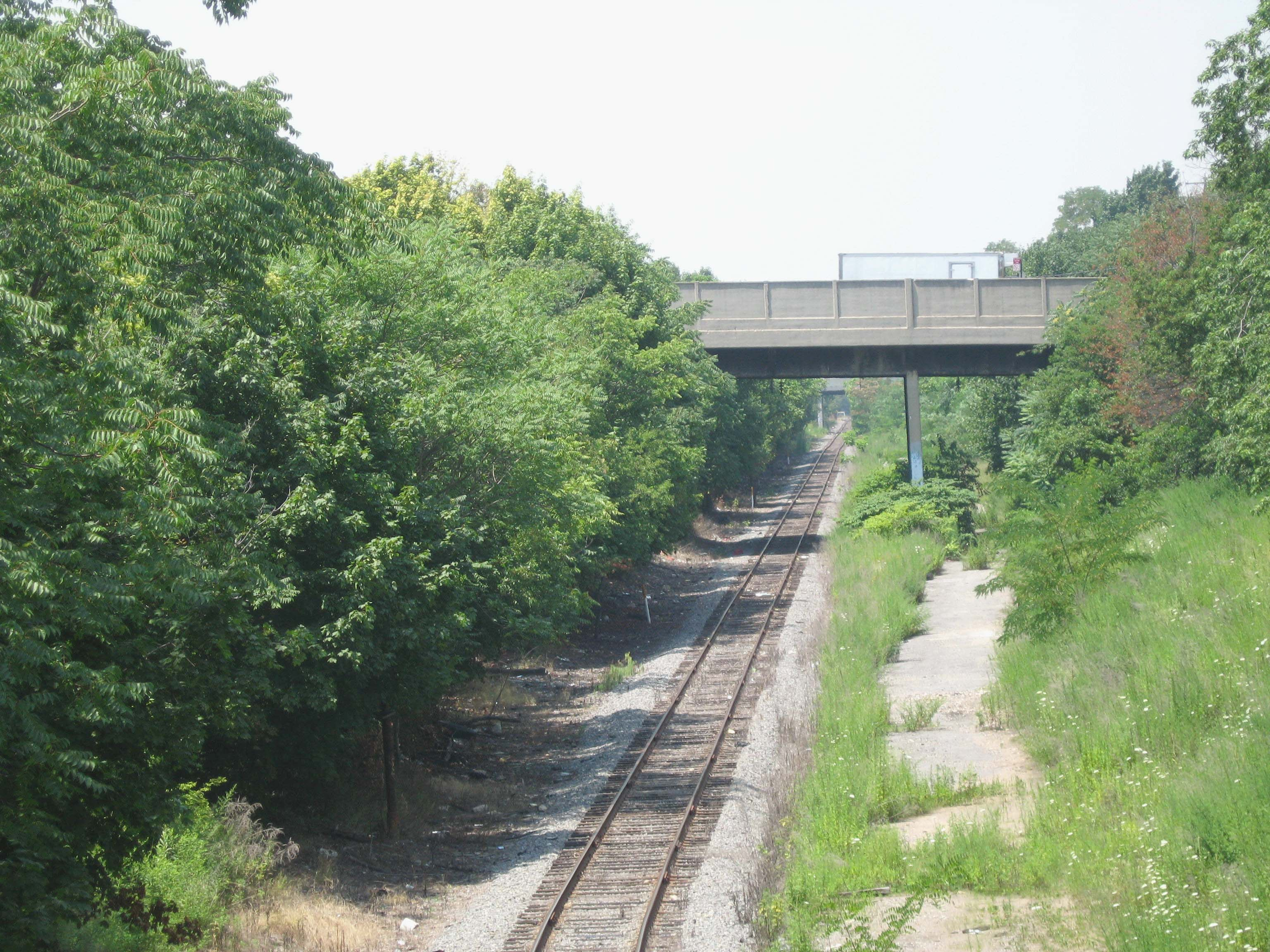
- Looking west from 14th Avenue in Borough Park, Brooklyn

Overview
- Status: Active
- Owner: Long Island Rail Road
- Locale: Brooklyn and Queens, New York City
- Termini: 65th Street Yard; Fresh Pond Junction
- Stations: 17 (all former)

Service
- Type: Freight
- System: Long Island Rail Road
- Operator: New York and Atlantic Railway

History
- Opened: 1876
- Completed: 1883
- Passenger service ended: 1924
- Electrification installed: 1927
- Electrification removed: 1968

Technical
- Num of tracks: 1–4
- Track gauge: 4 ft 8 1/2 in (1,435 mm) standard gauge

The Bay Ridge Branch is a rail line in New York City, owned by the Long Island Rail Road (LIRR) and operated by the New York and Atlantic Railway. It is the longest freight-only line of the LIRR, connecting the Montauk Branch and CSX Transportation's Fremont Secondary (to the Hell Gate Bridge) at Glendale, Queens, with the Upper New York Bay at Bay Ridge, Brooklyn.

Car float service provided by New York New Jersey Rail operates between Greenville Yard at Greenville, Jersey City and the 65th Street Yard at the Bay Ridge end of the line.

== History ==
=== Early history ===
The first part of the line was opened by the New York, Bay Ridge and Jamaica Railroad in 1876, from Bay Ridge to the crossing of the Brooklyn, Bath and Coney Island Railroad near New Utrecht.

An extension from New Utrecht east and northeast to New Lots opened in 1877, and at the same time the New York and Manhattan Beach Railway opened the line from New Lots north to East New York. An extension north from East New York to Cooper Avenue (and then northwest to Greenpoint, later the Evergreen Branch) opened in 1878, and the Long Island City and Manhattan Beach Railroad (incorporated February 24, 1883, merged with the New York and Manhattan Beach and New York, Bay Ridge and Jamaica into the New York, Brooklyn and Manhattan Beach Railway August 27, 1885) built from Cooper Avenue north to the Montauk Branch at Glendale in 1883.

=== Decline ===
Passenger service on the line ended in 1924. The entire line was electrified, starting on July 8, 1927, for New York, New Haven and Hartford Railroad freight trains coming off the New York Connecting Railroad (Hell Gate Bridge). Electric operation ended on December 31, 1968.

=== Reopening of the 65th Street Yard ===
On June 4, 1999, Mayor Rudy Giuliani announced that New York City reached an agreement to open and operate the 65th Street Yard with the New York and Atlantic Railway, which would use it as an intermodal facility to expand its customer base. The takeover of Conrail by Norfolk Southern Railway and CSX Transportation was expected to significantly increase rail freight movement into New York City. The yard was completely renovated by the New York City Economic Development Corporation. The NYCEDC also began work on a two-year Cross Harbor Freight Movement Study to evaluate options for a freight tunnel.

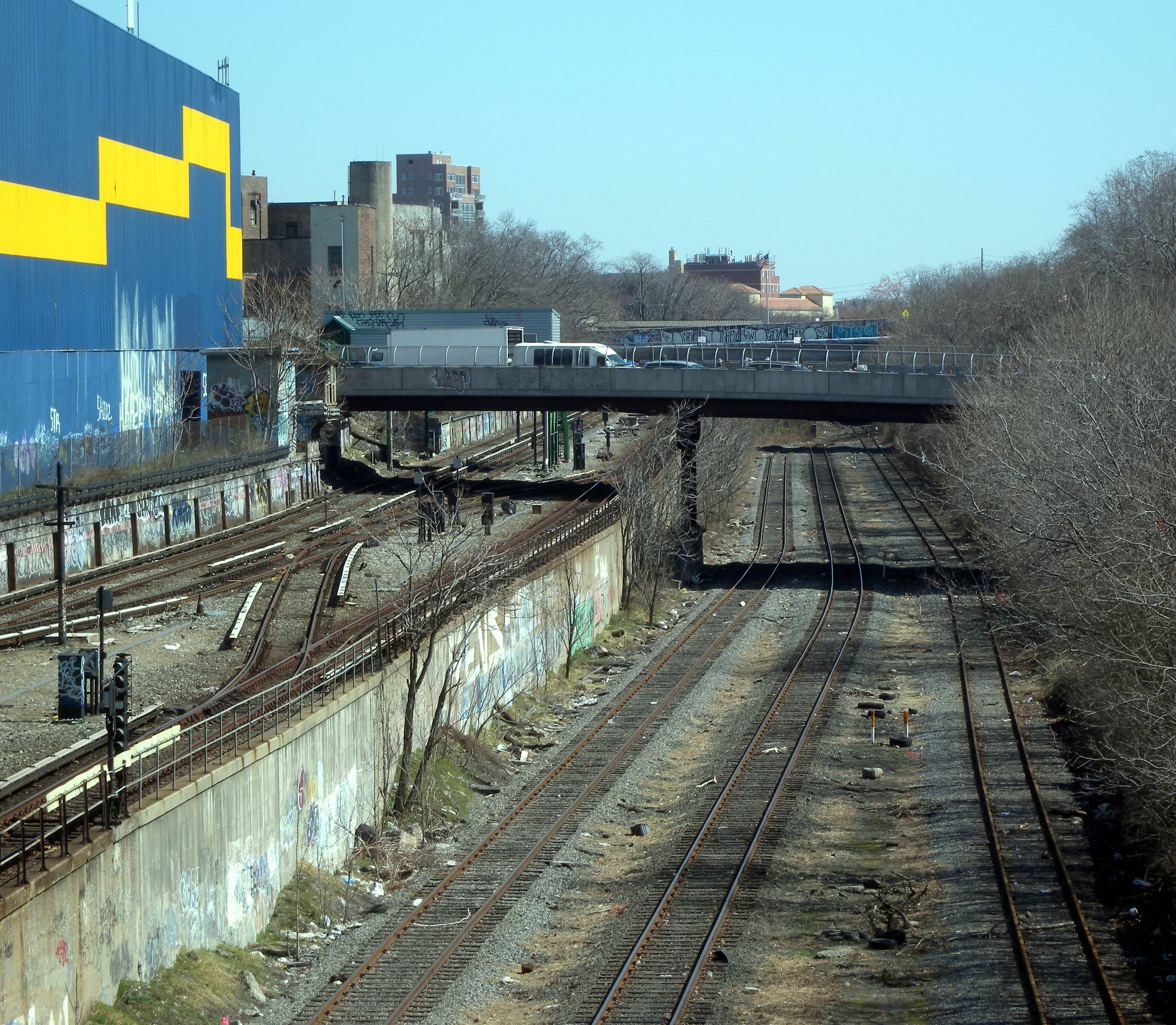
Triple track sharing an open cut with BMT Sea Beach Line (left)

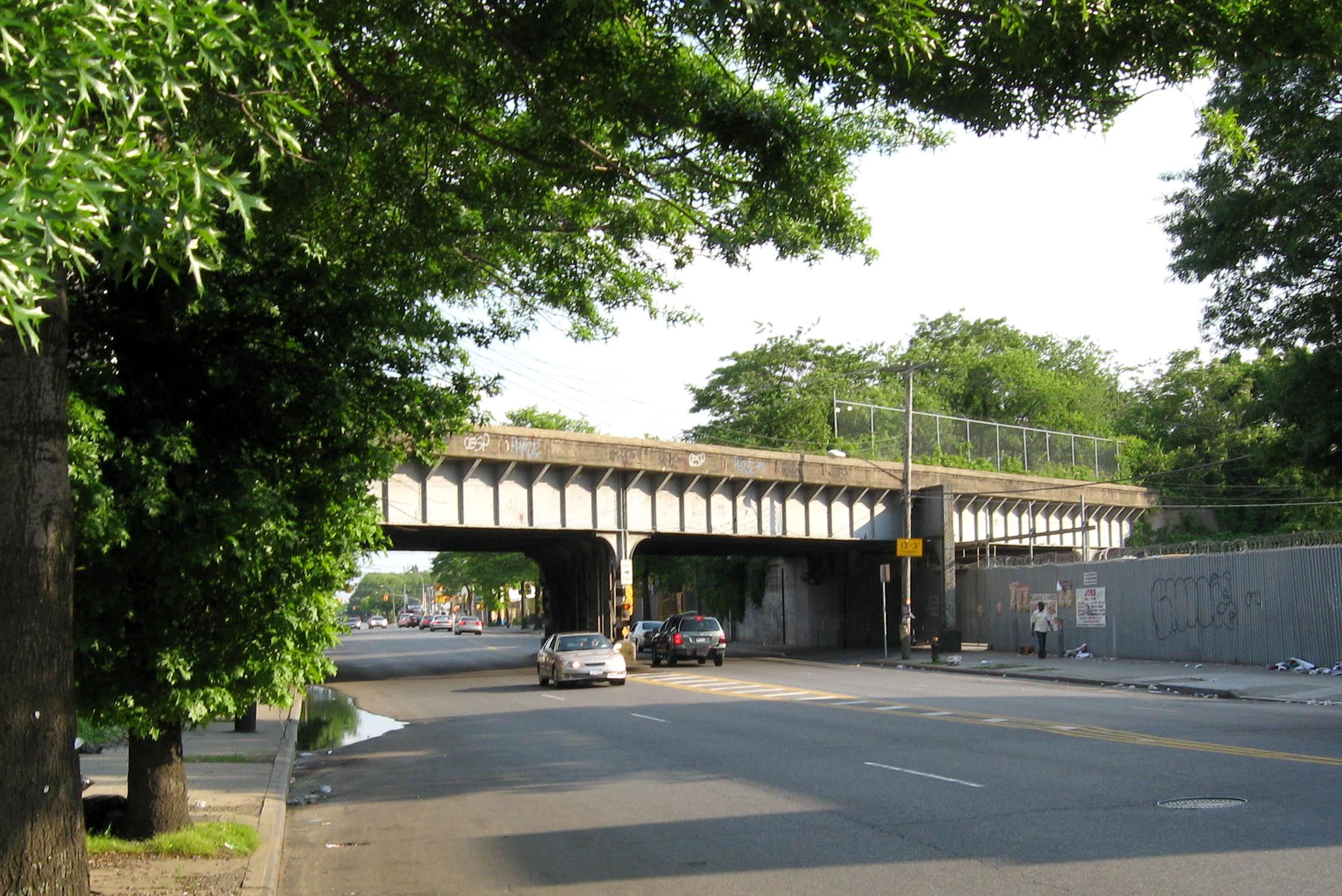
Crossing Ralph Avenue

== Proposals ==
A proposed Cross-Harbor Rail Tunnel from New Jersey to Brooklyn would use the Bay Ridge Branch to reach the rest of Long Island, with the line upgraded to double-stack clearances. The state is conducting an environmental review of the project.

Another proposal would have the New York City Subway use the tracks to link Brooklyn, Queens, and the Bronx via the Hell Gate Bridge. In 1996 the Regional Plan Association conducted a study to determine the feasibility of the rail link. Based on Paris's RER commuter rail system, the Triboro RX proposal would create a loop around the city. It was first proposed by the Regional Plan Association in 1996. The proposed line, discussion of which was revived in 2012, would connect to all non-shuttle subway services. Obstacles for the proposal include the proposed Cross-Harbor Rail Tunnel, the lack of electrification on the line, and the single-tracking in some parts of the line. Additionally, there is debate on where the line's northern terminus would be: some, including MoveNY, call for it to end at Hunts Point, while others suggest it end at Yankee Stadium.

== Interborough Express ==
In mid-October 2019, the MTA announced that it would study the feasibility of restoring passenger service on the Bay Ridge Branch between Bay Ridge and Astoria, a portion of the proposed Triboro RX route. On January 23, 2020, the MTA Board awarded a $1.3 million contract to study the feasibility of restoring passenger service to this section to AECOM. In November 2021, Acting MTA Chairman and CEO Janno Lieber said that money from Infrastructure Investment and Jobs Act could be used to fund the completion of the Bay Ridge Branch project.

In early January 2022, as part of her State of the State address, New York governor Kathy Hochul announced that the state would move forward with the Bay Ridge Branch Line by conducting an environmental study on the Interborough Express, a 14-mile (23 km) corridor using the existing Bay Ridge Branch from Bay Ridge, Brooklyn, to Jackson Heights, Queens. The study would consider whether the line should be heavy rail (rapid transit or regional rail), light rail, or bus rapid transit. End-to-end travel times are expected to be 40 minutes, and weekday ridership is initially projected to be 74,000 to 88,000. The route would connect up to 17 subway lines and the Long Island Rail Road. A feasibility study was also completed on January 20, 2022. Governor Hochul also announced that she had directed the Port Authority of New York and New Jersey to complete an environmental review for the Cross-Harbor Rail Tunnel for freight. Hochul announced in her January 2023 address that the project would proceed as a light rail corridor. Reasons for the light rail choice include faster service, easier construction—mostly fitting in existing right of way with a short on street segment, availability of off-the-shelf rolling stock and a lower overall cost, estimated at $5.5 billion. The proposed headway is 5 minutes during peak hours and 10 minutes at other times. Freight use would continue, requiring separated tracks.

== Former stations ==
The following passenger stations once existed on the line:

Station	Date opened	Date closed	Notes
Bay Ridge	1893	May 14, 1924	Connection to 65th Street Yard
Third Avenue	June 2, 1883	May 14, 1924	
Brooklyn, Bath and Coney Island Railroad Crossing	June 2, 1883	1894	Crossing with the Brooklyn, Bath and Coney Island Railroad
Parkville	June 2, 1883	1884	Connection to the Prospect Park and Coney Island Railroad
Manhattan Beach Junction	1884	1915	Former junction with the Manhattan Beach Branch
Ocean Avenue	July 18, 1877	May 14, 1924	
Kings County Central Junction	June 29, 1878	late 1878	
Vanderveer Park	1878	May 14, 1924	Originally named Flatlands
Kouwenhoven	July 18, 1877	May 14, 1924	
Rugby	1888	May 14, 1924	Originally named Ford's Corners
New Lots Road	July 18, 1877	1897	
East New York	July 18, 1877	May 14, 1924	Junction with Atlantic Branch, originally named Manhattan Crossing
Fulton Street	1914	May 14, 1924	
Bushwick Avenue	July 18, 1877	May 14, 1924	Originally Central Avenue
Central Avenue	June 2, 1883	1884	
Cooper Avenue Junction	June 2, 1883	1894	Junction with Evergreen Branch
Cypress Avenue	1888	May 14, 1924	Originally named Dummy Crossing, then Ridgewood
Myrtle Avenue	1893	May 14, 1924	At the intersection with Fresh Pond Road, track continues north as the New York Connecting Railroad and connects west/east to the Lower Montauk Branch
Fresh Pond	1869	1998	Originally named Bushwick Junction (Lower Montauk Branch)

== See also ==
- Manhattan Beach Branch
- Rail freight transportation in New York City and Long Island
