= 65th Street Yard =

Rail yard in New York City

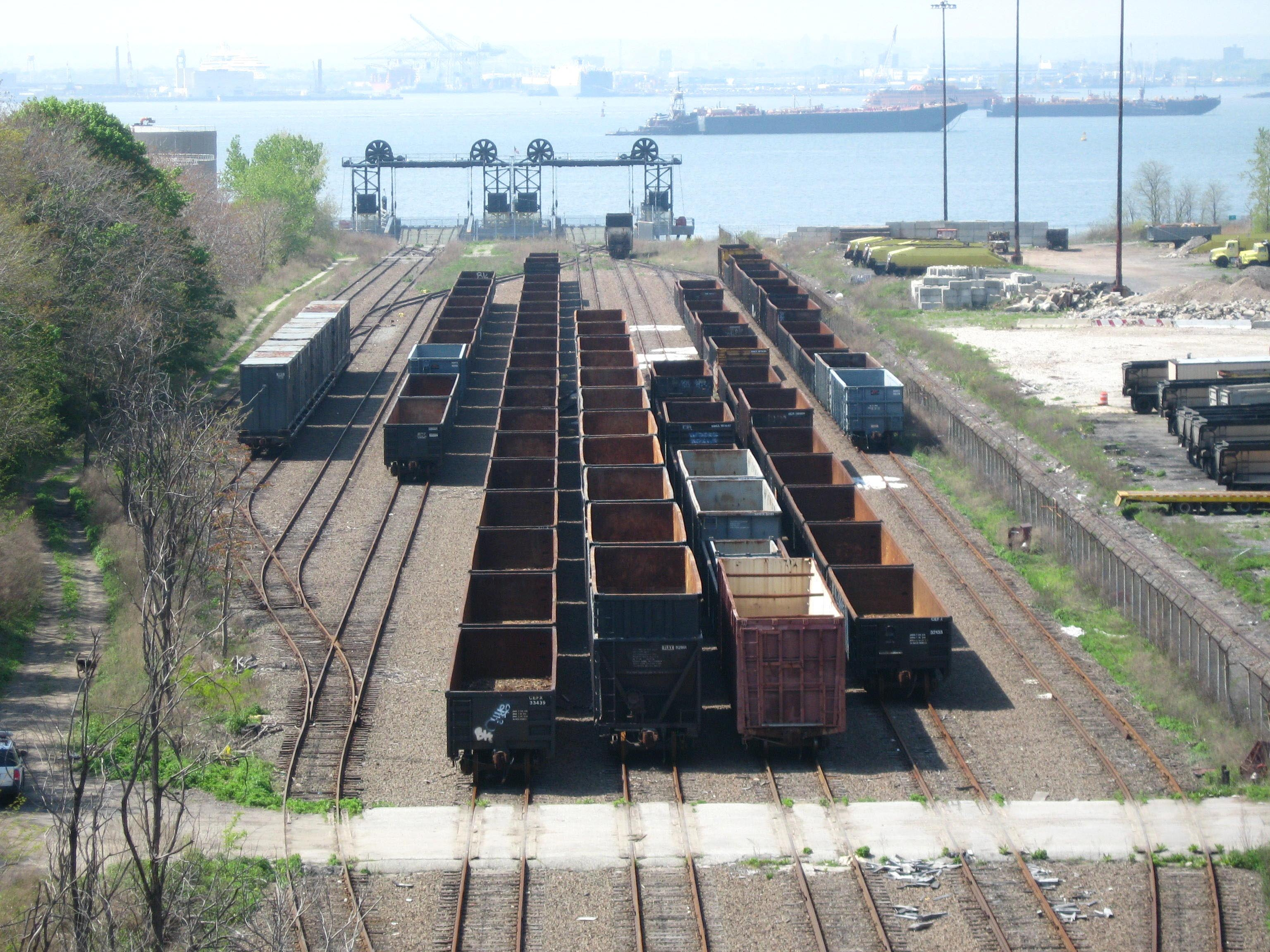
- The 65th Street Yard in 2008
- Interactive map of 65th Street Yard

Location
- Location: Sunset Park and Bay Ridge, Brooklyn, New York
- Coordinates: 40.6416°N 74.0271°W

Characteristics
- Owner: New Haven Railroad (until 1968); City and State of New York (1981-2008); Port Authority of New York and New Jersey (2008-present)
- Type: Freight

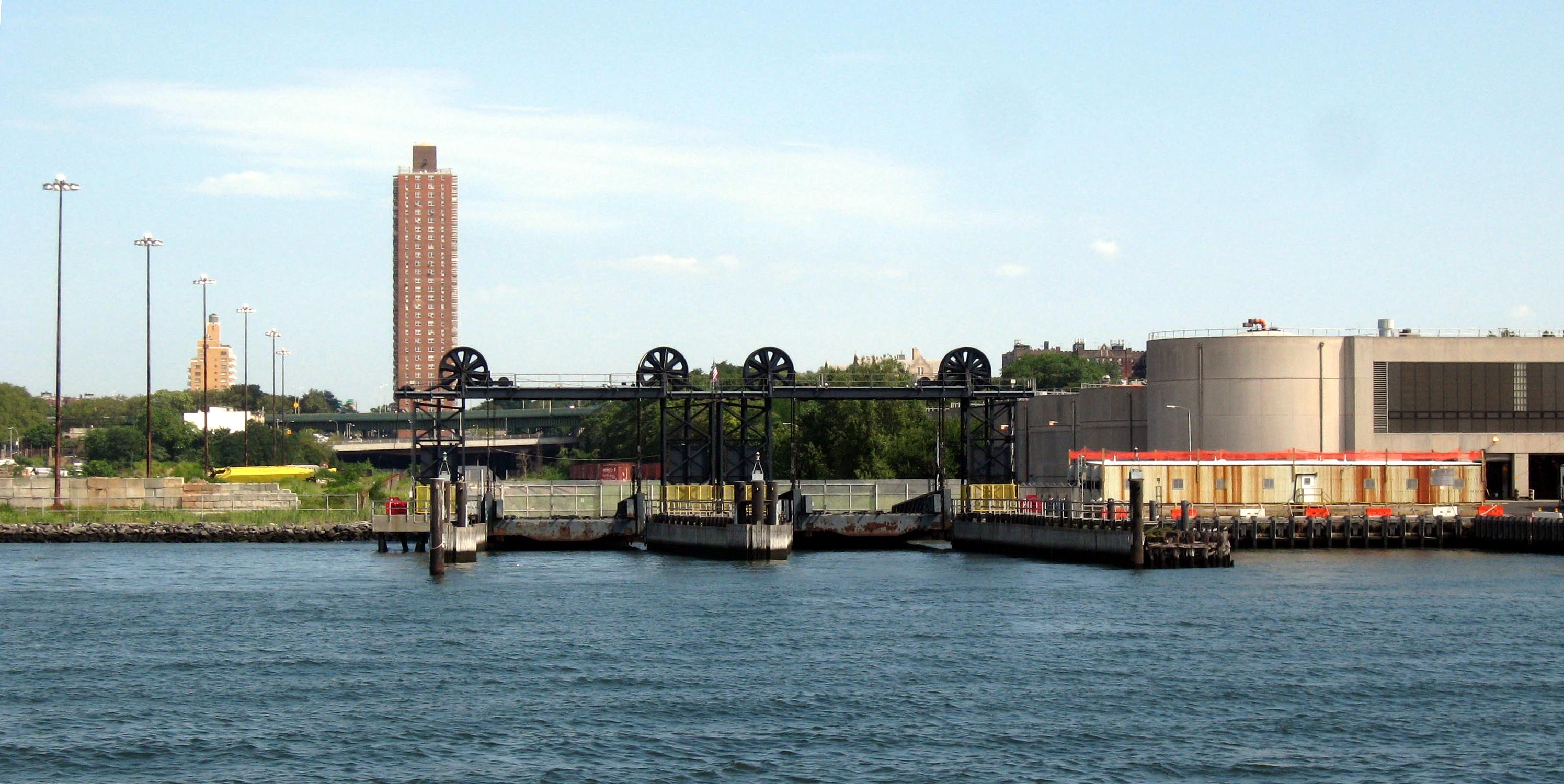
65th Street Yard from the harbor. These car float bridges, built in 1999, had never been in service until 2012.

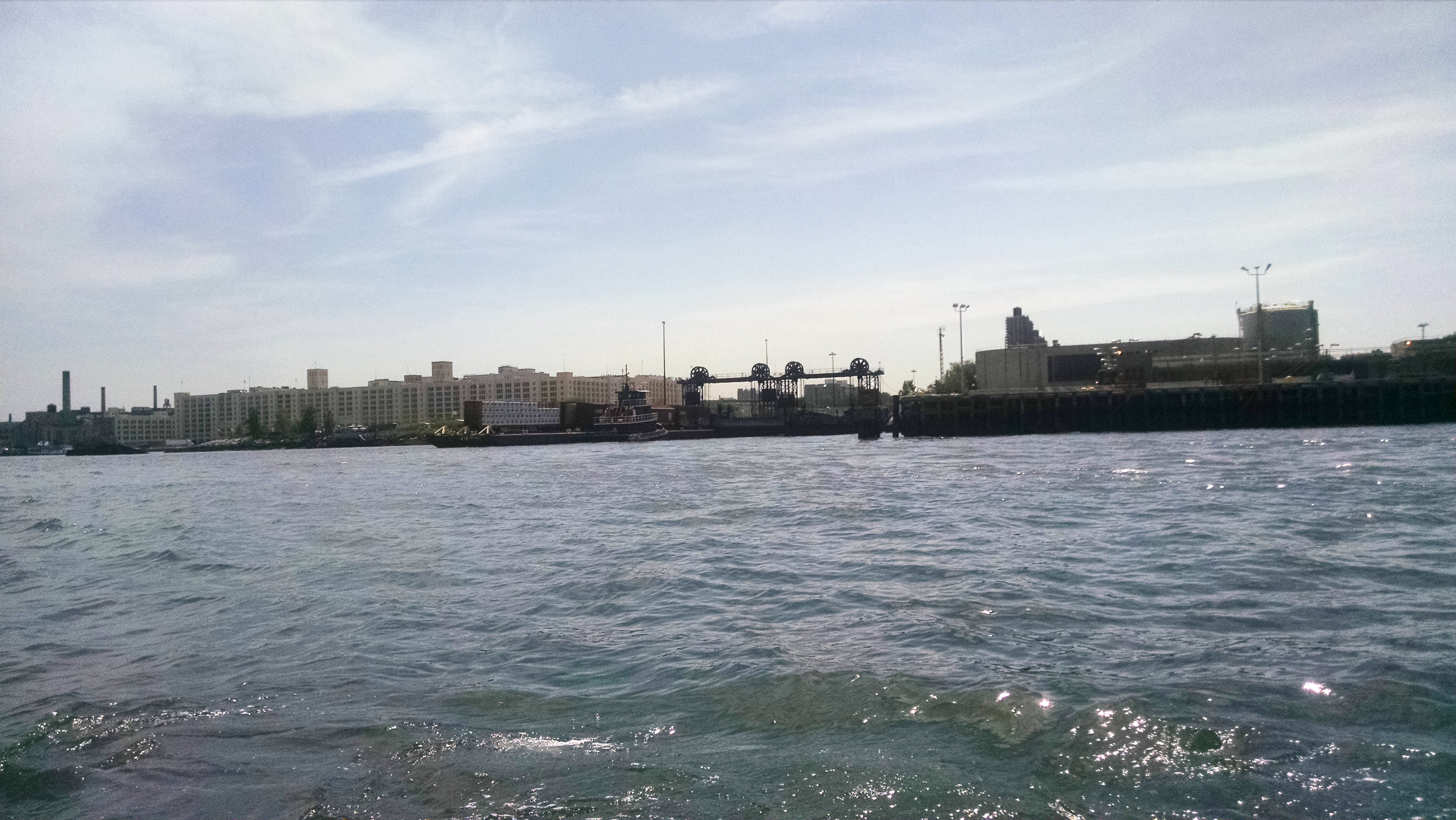
Car float in operation in 2016

The 65th Street Yard, also Bay Ridge Rail Yard, is a rail yard on the Upper New York Bay in Sunset Park and Bay Ridge, Brooklyn. Equipped with two transfer bridges which allow rail cars to be loaded and unloaded onto car floats, it is the last of once extensive car float operations in the Port of New York and New Jersey. Located adjacent to the Brooklyn Army Terminal, it provided a major link in the city's rail freight network in the first half of the twentieth century. It was later used as a conventional railroad yard at the end of the LIRR/NY&A Bay Ridge Branch. The new transfer bridges were constructed in 1999, but remained unused until the transfer bridges were activated in July 2012.

== Early History ==
The first facility at this location was originally created by the Long Island Rail Road.

The history of the 65th Street Yard & Terminal begins in November 20, 1875 and with passenger service, with the construction of the New York, Bay Ridge and Jamaica Railroad, and the route was originally called the "Manhattan Beach Branch". This railroad served primarily passenger service; with a slight freight service; with terminals being at LIRR Atlantic Branch in East New York, and the Evergreen Branch in Bushwick and eventually to Manhattan Beach, which was east of Brighton Beach in Coney Island.

Gradually this line would be extended west from the Manhattan Beach Branch in Midwood to the Bay Ridge shoreline; to connect with ferry service to and from Manhattan. The railroad line was also extended east to Fresh Pond, Queens; to connect with the existing Long Island Rail Road service at that location.

The segment from the Bay Ridge Ferry (to South Ferry, Manhattan) to the junction of the Brooklyn, Bath and Coney Island Railroad (West End Line) at New Utrecht, opened on August 23, 1876. Trains were operated over the Brooklyn, Bath & Coney Island trackage to Coney Island via rights from this junction.

Banker and financier Austin Corbin incorporated the New York and Manhattan Beach Railway on October 24, 1876, with the intent to build a branch of this line to Manhattan Beach and extend it beyond East New York to Greenpoint and Hunter's Point. Corbin gained control of the New York, Bay Ridge and Jamaica Railroad on November 15, 1876.

The New York, Bay Ridge and Jamaica Railroad built the line from Bay Ridge east to New Lots, while the New York & Manhattan Beach Railroad built from Manhattan Beach north to what was called Manhattan Beach Junction - which was located near the present day intersections of Avenue H and Avenue I at East 17th Street.

== Freight Use ==
The planning for the Bay Ridge Freight Yard as we have come to know it as a freight route; dates back to 1892; when the Pennsylvania RR was looking for a doorway into New England freight traffic. Most of the routes in New England were already developed and claimed, and perhaps in learning a lesson from the rate war with the New York Central over their trying to build into PRR's territory; building a new railroad in competition was out of the question.

But what it could do, was partner with an existing railroad; and the most extensive railroad throughout New England was the New York, New Haven & Hartford Railroad. Besides which, the Pennsylvania was a "mortal enemy" of the New York Central; and anything that would help them gain territory in customer competition was an advantage.

== 20th Century ==
In 1900, the Pennsylvania Railroad gained control of the Long Island Rail Road; which owned the Bay Ridge Branch, This was to be another positive aspect to choosing this routing.

However, the railroads still needed to cross from Queens to the Bronx. And for that they turned to Gustav Lindenthal and the construction of the Hell Gate Bridge. The construction of this bridge and viaduct was an extremely integral part of the New York Connecting Railroad (from Fresh Pond to the Bronx), as well as the Long Island Rail Road's Bay Ridge Branch from 65th Street to Fresh Pond Yard.

The New York Connecting Railroad had been originally incorporated in 1892 for $100,000; but by 1899, had only sold $41,000 worth of stock. The Pennsylvania Railroad purchased all outstanding shares of the New York Connecting Railroad, and in accordance with their agreement, sold half of that to the New York, New Haven & Hartford Railroad.

While the business partnership aspect was being hammered out; the City of New York forced the Long Island Rail Road to grade separate the Bay Bridge Branch from the streets and avenues commencing in 1904; as well as grade separation from the steam railroads providing rapid transit routes where the LIRR crossed at grade.

In 1905, the New York Connecting Railroad (now financed by the Pennsylvania) began a very vigorous acquisition of land for the right of way north of Fresh Pond Yard of the LIRR to Astoria shore line to build the viaduct for as we as the Hell Gate Bridge itself.

The Long Island Rail Road constructed piers for the transfer of lumber at the shore line in 1907, as well as platforms for the transfer of freight at the foot of 63rd Street and 64th Streets.

Also in 1907, the City of New York approved the franchise, and the Pennsylvania Railroad and the New York, New Haven & Hartford Railroad started construction in 1910 (date in question.)

Following this, the PRR and the NYNH&H RR entered into partnership for the construction of a freight yard and transfer facility - as opposed to a freight terminal or freight house - the location was to be simply a transfer point of freight cars between the two railroads. Between 1911 and 1917, the Bay Ridge Yards, and with it the carfloat facilities; were planned to be connected to New England via the Bay Ridge Branch and the route under construction with the Hell Gate Bridge.

With the agreement finally in place; the facilities at 65th Street were constructed. Built under investment by the New Haven Railroad and the Pennsylvania Railroads; operation was the responsibility of the Long Island Rail Road.

As originally constructed, the 65th Street Yard had four electrically operated, carfloat transfer bridges of the Overhead Suspension Contained Apron type (James B. French Patent). These were unusually named in alphabetical order from south to north: "Abie", "Benny", "Charlie" and "Davy" (transfer bridges were usually numbered and / or took on the name of the location: "Greenville" "Harsimus Cove".

When completed, these four transfer bridges handled more than 1000 cars per day from the 1920s to the 1950s. In front of each transfer bridge was a "sub-yard" of which allowed the simulateneous loading and unloading of carfloats; greatly increasing productivity. These four sub-yards together comprised the 65th Street Yard as a whole unit.

The Pennsylvania RR routed freight traffic to 65th Street via their transfer facility at Greenville, NJ. At 65th Street, Long Island Rail Road crews drilled (placed outbound and removed inbound freight cars on the carfloats) and assembled through freight trains in the four "sub-yards" for New York New Haven & Hartford to expedite to points north. Local service to industries along the Bay Ridge Branch and to Fresh Pond, Queens were the responsibility of the Long Island Rail Road.

== Decline ==
As typical of almost all freight railroad service in New York Harbor, rail traffic subsequently declined following the widespread adaptation of trucking for door to door delivery for long distance service. In 1964; even with the Vietnam War ramping up; the US military decided to close the Brooklyn Army Terminal, and so a significant sources of freight traffic through 65th Street Yard was eliminated. Containerization further curtailed break bulk freight shipping in boxcars and with modern container ports being located in Staten Island and New Jersey now easily accessible via the new Verrazzano Narrows Bridge which opened to traffic in 1964.

Within a decade, the Pennsylvania RR was to be found in increasingly dire straights. The ill-fated merger with the New York Central Railroad (in a similar financial position); and the forcible inclusion of the New York, New Haven & Hartford Railroad into the merger was not to succeed.

In their efforts to cut expenditures, the newly formed Penn Central (PC) curtailed their rail-marine interchange services throughout New York Harbor. Service to the yard 65th Street Yard was terminated in 1968. The four transfer bridges sat idle for a short period, and were removed no later than 1972 by Penn Central.

For the most part, the Yard sat mostly unused; with only Long Island Rail Road using it the 65th Street Yard as a storage facility for staging rail cars in local industry service along the Bay Ridge Branch; until enough freight cars could be assembled to be brought back to Fresh Pond Yard at the end of the week (instead of bringing only one or two cars back each trip.)

In 1978, the New York Dock Railway installed a pontoon supported pony plate girder float bridge, relocated from Erie Railroad's West 28th Street Yard in Manhattan. This float bridge is referred as "Brooklyn Army Terminal float bridge", abbreviated "BAT bridge". The purpose for this was to keep the 65th Street Yard accessible, while the First Avenue was reconstructed and the railroad tracks torn out and rebuild to more modern standard for both weight and length of modern freight cars. With the First Avenue running tracks out of service, the 65th Street Yard could therefore not be reached from the float bridges in use at Bush Terminal. This float bridge was used until about 1991, and was abandoned in situ. The wreck of the bridge is still visible partially submerged in the water, just off the northwest corner of the yard.

In 1981 the 65th Street Yard was purchased by the City and State of New York, which paid $2.5 million for the 24-acre (9.7 ha) site, and the transfer bridges were built in 1999 at a cost of $20 million in funding from the NYC Economic Development Corporation.

The new transfer bridges appear to be a simplified design: single two track span with no apron, overhead gantry, counterbalanced with electrically operated span hoist. This design appears to be a variant of the type seen on the West Coast and possibly an improvement on the design of the transfer bridge located at the 207th Street Yard in Manhattan.

However these two new transfer bridges would remain unused for car float operations; since the New York Cross Harbor Railroad, the successor of New York Dock Railway and Brooklyn Eastern District Terminal operations, abandoned plans to move its operation from Bush Terminal at 50th Street, to the 65th Street Yard due to financial disputes between the City of New York and the Railroad.

The New York Cross Harbor Railroad like its predecessors; moved rail cars by car float to and from Greenville Yard in Jersey City. It was purchased in 2006 by Mid Atlantic New England Rail, LLC, which renamed the railroad to New York New Jersey Rail, LLC (NYNJ). In 2008 the railroad was purchased by the Port Authority of New York and New Jersey. The Port Authority then commenced upon the restoration of the 65th Street Yard for service by NYNJ in 2011 as part of a $118.1 million investment for the restoration of the existing rail car float system operating between Greenville and sites at 51st and 65th Streets in Brooklyn, N.Y., including the purchase of Greenville Yard.

== Resurrection ==
In July 2012 the 65th Street Yard was reopened, with one transfer bridge in use with the other kept in a stand by mode. Car float operation was relocated from Bush Terminal to the 65th Street Yard.

In October 2012 Superstorm Sandy severely damaged the antiquated Greenville transfer bridges. Car floating operations was temporarily suspended until the basic infrastructure could be constructed, so that one of the (now) unused float bridges from 51th Street at Bush Terminal could be relocated to Greenville. This effort took just 51 days.

The goal of NYNJ is to increase the traffic from the actual 1,600 cars to 23,000 cars by 2017. In the future commodities shall include fruit, home heating oil and new cars.

By 2025, the number of carloads transported by NYNJ Rail has steadily risen, no doubt reducing a significant portion of road traffic and related emissions.

== See also ==
- Rail freight transportation in New York City and Long Island
- South Brooklyn Railway
- Cross-Harbor Rail Tunnel
- Bay Ridge Branch
- South Brooklyn Marine Terminal
