= New York New Jersey Rail =

US railroad with cross harbor car float

Coordinates: 40°40′44″N 74°4′25″W

New York New Jersey Rail, LLC

Overview
- Headquarters: Greenville, Jersey City, New Jersey
- Reporting mark: NYNJ
- Locale: Upper New York Bay
- Dates of operation: 2006–present
- Predecessor: New York Cross Harbor Railroad

Technical
- Track gauge: 4 ft 8 1/2 in (1,435 mm) standard gauge
- Length: 4 miles (6 kilometers) (car float) 4.5 miles (7 kilometers) (trackage)

Other
- Website: nynjr.com

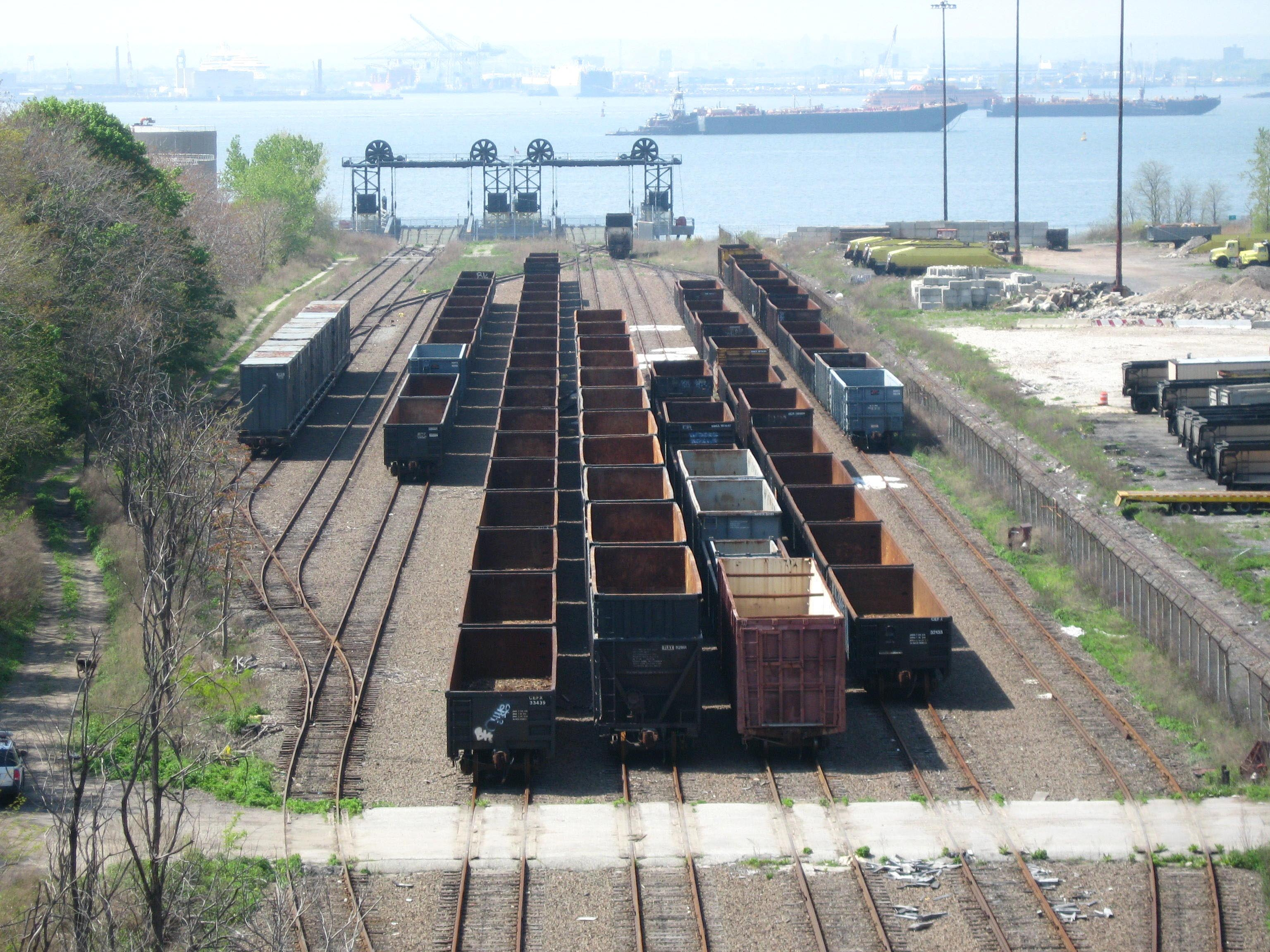
The 65th Street Yard in Brooklyn, refurbished in 1999 by the city of New York. The refurbished yard was placed in service for car floats in July 2012.

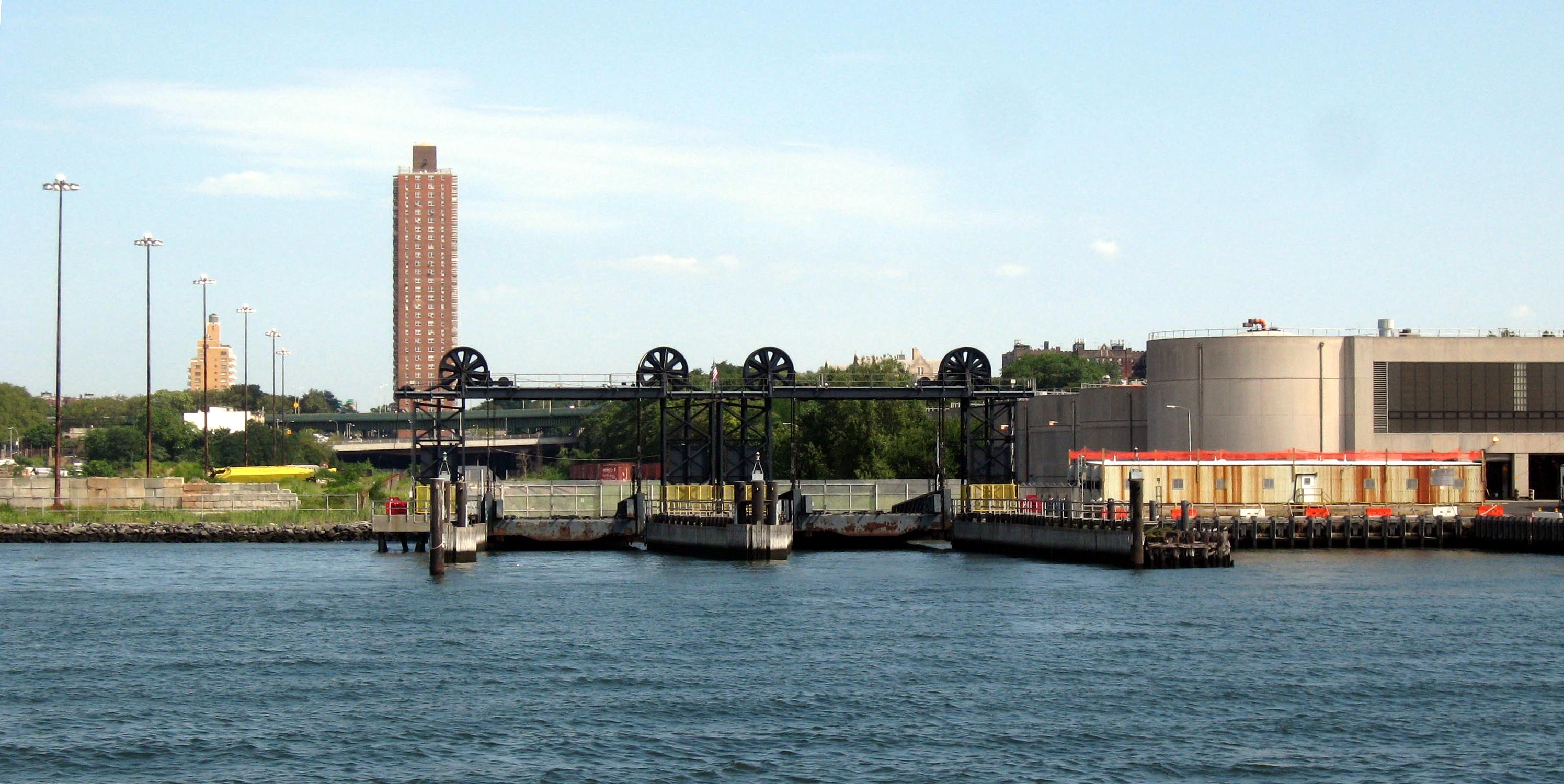
The 65th Street Yard from the harbor.

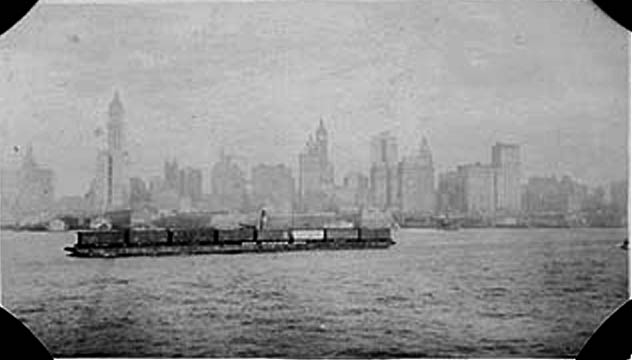
A railroad car float in the Upper New York Bay, 1919. Similar barges are still used today.

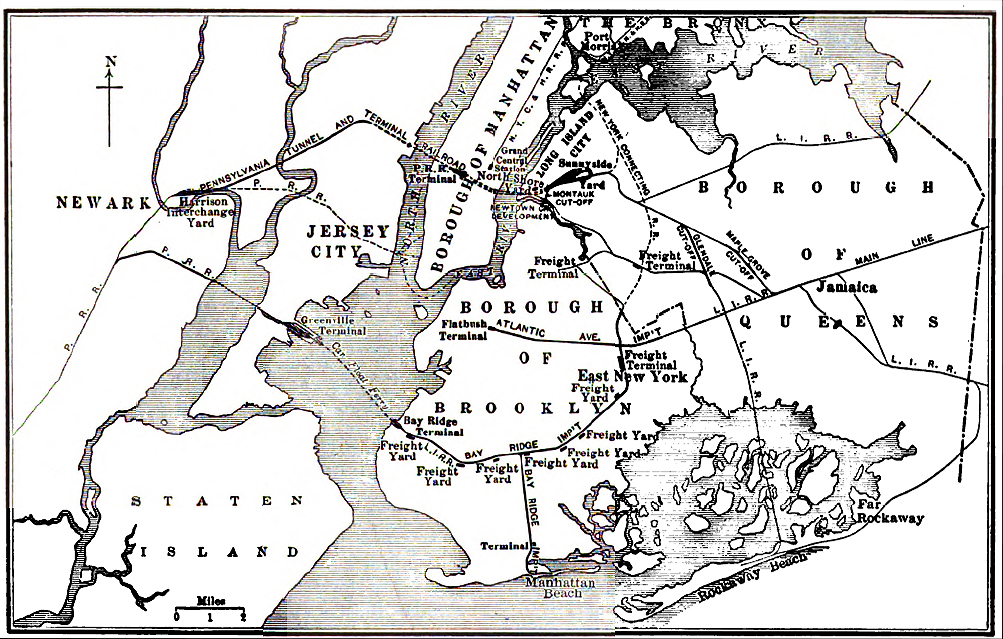
1912 Pennsylvania Railroad map showing cross harbor car float operations. Rail and barge routes shown on the map are largely the same as those in use a century later.

New York New Jersey Rail, LLC (reporting mark NYNJ) is a switching and terminal railroad that operates the only car float operation across Upper New York Bay between Jersey City, New Jersey and Brooklyn, New York. Since mid-November 2008, it has been owned by the Port Authority of New York and New Jersey, which acquired it for about $16 million as a step in a process that might see a Cross-Harbor Rail Tunnel completed.

Since freight trains are not allowed in Amtrak's North River Tunnels, and the Poughkeepsie Bridge was closed in 1974, the ferry is the only freight crossing of the Hudson River south of the Alfred H. Smith Memorial Bridge, 140 miles (230 km) to the north of New York City, in a process known as the Selkirk hurdle. It is the last remaining car float operation in the Port of New York and New Jersey.

The railroad operates in two divisions, the Marine division and Port Jersey Rail division. Its switching operations on the New York side include a short spur north to Bush Terminal which runs through the Brooklyn Army Terminal complex and then through the center of First Avenue in Sunset Park. This spur is the last example of active street-running rail operations in New York City.

== Operations ==
The Port Authority long term leases Greenville Yard in Greenville, Jersey City from ConRail, where it connects with Class I railroads CSX Transportation and Norfolk Southern Railway, which jointly operate Conrail Shared Assets Operations' North Jersey Shared Assets Area. On the Bay Ridge, Brooklyn end, the 6-acre (2.4 ha) 65th Street Yard connect to the Long Island Rail Road's freight-only Bay Ridge Branch, which is operated by the New York and Atlantic Railway, and the New York City Transit Authority's South Brooklyn Railway. The 4 mile barge trip across the harbor takes approximately 45 minutes. The equivalent trip by truck is 35–50 miles.

As of 2012, the NYNJ system moves approximately 1,500 rail cars across the harbor per year. Port Authority officials suggested that the system can transport as many as 25,000 cars annually. NYNJ replaced two EMD GP38-2 with three low-emission locomotives from Knoxville Locomotive Works in Tennessee for $5 million. As of July 2015, the system had moved about 4900 rail cars year-to-date.

== History ==
From 1983 to 2006, the operation was known as the New York Cross Harbor Railroad (reporting mark NYCH). Earlier predecessors include the Brooklyn Eastern District Terminal Company, Bush Terminal Railroad, New York Dock Railway, and New York, New Haven & Hartford Railroad and Pennsylvania Railroad operations at Bay Ridge and Greenville.

In 1999, the city of New York rehabilitated the larger 65th Street Yard for car float operations with two transfer bridges. It was not turned over to NYCH because of a dispute over money owed the city. NYCH continued to use the single transfer bridge at Bush Terminal instead. In 2002, New York Cross Harbor Railroad revenues from railroad operations were $1,685,899. It had 48 active customers, with shipments of cocoa from docks in Brooklyn as its largest line of business. It also operated a trucking service and offered shipside and dockside service for receipt or delivery of various types of cargo, such as oversized steel beams.

NYCH ceased to exist in 2006; a new company, Mid-Atlantic New England Rail, LLC of West Seneca, New York, bought the railroad and renamed it New York New Jersey Rail, LLC (NYNJ). The city of New York purchased the company two years later.

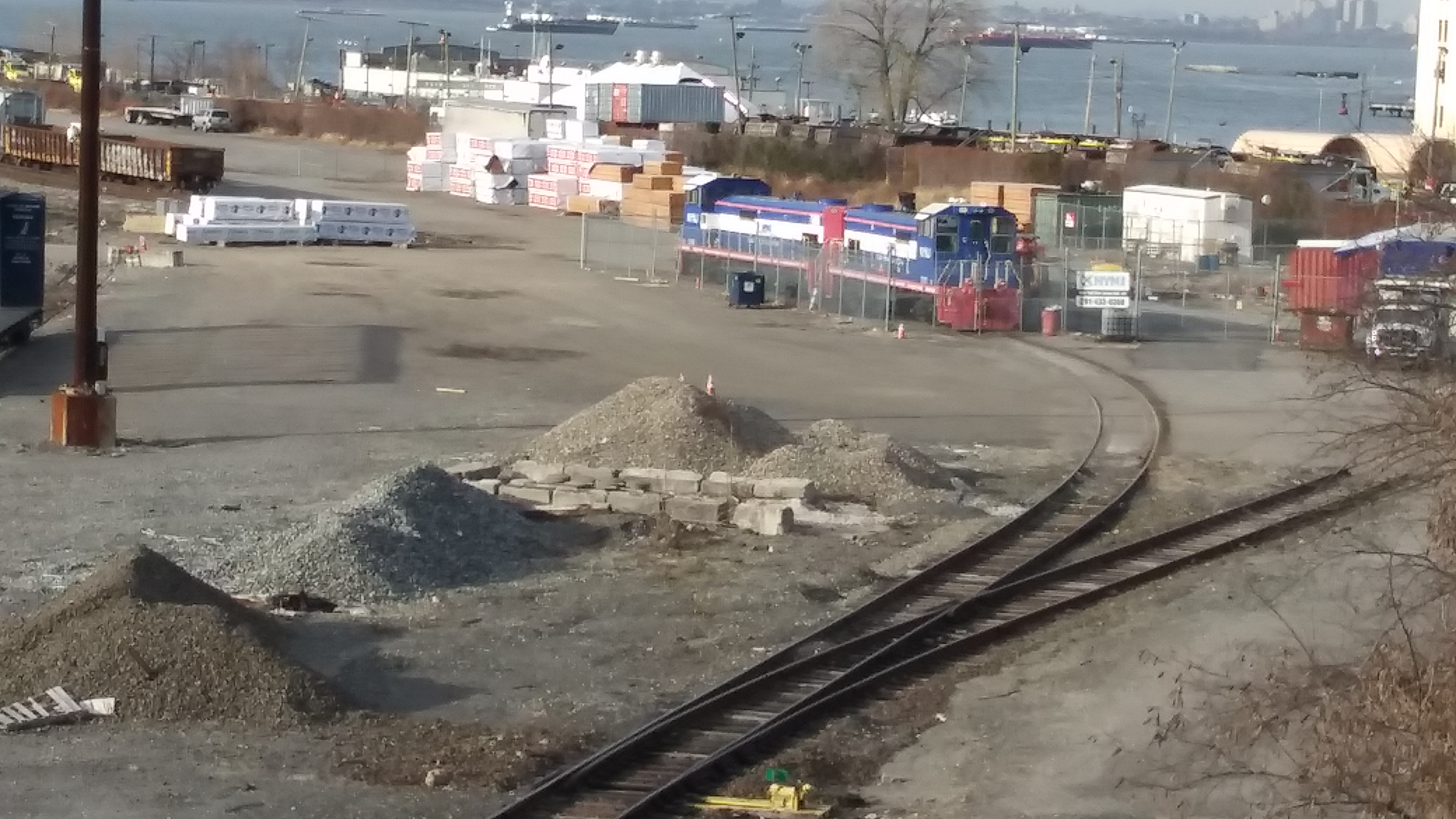
NYNJ diesel locomotive on 65th street terminal

The Port Authority began working with government agencies in New York and New Jersey to bring NYNJ to a state of good repair. This includes emergency work to stabilize the transfer bridge structure in Greenville, repairs to the transfer bridge and track infrastructure in Brooklyn, and procurement of ultra-low emissions locomotives and a new 30-car rail barge. In May 2010 the Port Authority announced that it would purchase Greenville Yard and build a new barge-to-rail facility there, as well as improving the existing rail car float system. The barge-to-rail facility is expected to handle an estimated 60,000 to 90,000 containers of solid waste per year from New York City, eliminating up to 360,000 trash truck trips a year. The authority's board authorized $118.1 million for the overall project. In December that same year the NYNJ purchased the 2.4 mile Port Jersey Railroad to improve its access to shippers in the Greenville port area.

In November 2011, the Port Authority hired HDR, Inc. of Omaha, Nebraska to rehabilitate Greenville Yard. Work included rehabilitating the railyard and waterfront structures, including a rail barge and transfer bridge, demolishing two other bridges, designing a new barge and two new bridges, and adding 10,000 feet of track. In July 2012, NYNJ began operating out of the 65th Street Yard. Initial cargo included apples, home heating oil, new automobiles, and scrap metal. The railroad north along First Avenue was refurbished and new tracks laid to support operations at the South Brooklyn Marine Terminal, including an automobile import pier and a new municipal recycling plant.

On October 29, 2012, Hurricane Sandy caused major damage to the Greenville facility, undermining the transfer bridge gantries and sinking one of the car floats. The 81-year-old gantry structures were ultimately demolished. The working float bridge at Bush Terminal was transferred by barge to Greenville, where it was re-designated the Greenville Pontoon Bridge. Service was restored in late December, after 52 days of intensive reconstruction.

On September 17, 2014, the Port Authority announced that it was funding a major redevelopment of the Greenville Yard, to include a new ExpressRail container terminal servicing the Port Jersey Global Marine Terminal. The Port Authority would also build two new rail-to-barge transfer bridges, purchase two new car float barges, and buy four new ultra low emission locomotives In November 2017, the first of the new barges, NYNJR100, was delivered to NYNJ. Built by Metal Trades, Inc., the four-track barge can carry up to 18 rail cars of 60-foot (18 m) length, with up to 2,298 long tons (2,335 tonne) of cargo. The second barge, NYNJR200, was delivered in December 2018. An older, 14-car barge, the 278, is still in service. The new ExpressRail container terminal opened January 7, 2019, with four tracks out of eight operational. The remaining four tracks were opened on June 17, 2019.

In July 2017, the Port Authority announced a $35 million study to build a Cross-Harbor Rail Tunnel, suitable for freight. If built, the tunnel would eliminate the need for the NYNJ ferry.

== See also ==
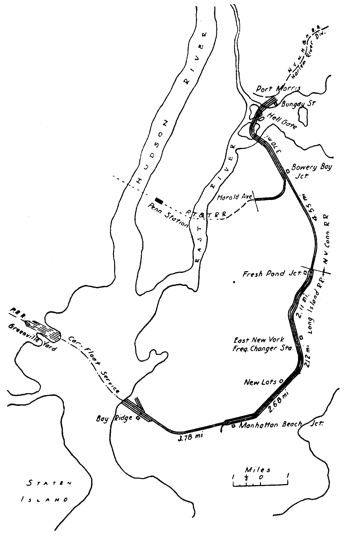
New York Connecting Railroad

- Rail freight transportation in New York City and Long Island
- New York Connecting Railroad
- National Docks Secondary
- Gantry Plaza State Park
- New York Central Railroad 69th Street Transfer Bridge
- Port Jersey
- CG Railway, operates a train ferry connecting southern Mexico with Mobile, Alabama.
