= Greenville Yard =

Freight yard in Hudson County, New Jersey, US

Greenville Yard is a freight rail yard in the Port of New York and New Jersey. It is located on Upper New York Bay in Jersey City, New Jersey, adjacent and north of Port Jersey. Originally developed in 1904 by the Pennsylvania Railroad, it was later taken over by Conrail. It has been owned by the Port Authority of New York and New Jersey since 2010. It takes its name from the former municipality of Greenville, now part of the city.

== New York New Jersey Rail ==
The New York New Jersey Rail, LLC, (formerly the New York Cross Harbor Railroad), transfers freight cars across the bay to the 65th Street Yard in Brooklyn, New York. This car float operation reduces transfer time since they are not permitted to use New York Tunnel Extension under the Hudson River, Manhattan, and East River. Overland must they cross the Hudson 140 miles (225 km) to the north at Selkirk, New York, making a detour known as the "Selkirk hurdle." NYNJ leases approximately 27 acres (11 ha) of land at Conrail's Greenville Yard, where it connects with two Class I railroads – CSX Transportation and Norfolk Southern Railway – both use Conrail's North Jersey Shared Assets Area Access to the national freight rail network and Canadian Pacific Railway is possible via the Lehigh Valley Railroad Bridge to the west or the Long Dock Tunnel to the northwest.

== ExpressRail Port Jersey ==
Greenville Yard is one of four rail terminals that compose ExpressRail, a PANYNJ initiative to improve rail transfers within the Port of New York and New Jersey. It serves the adjacent car float operation New York New Jersey Rail, barge-to-rail transfer of New York waste, and the adjacent CMA CGM Port Liberty Bayonne container facility.

In 2010, the PANYNJ purchased the yard with the intention to upgrade it, particularly to support New York solid waste transfer and reduce truck trips. In 2011, the PANYNJ contracted HDR, Inc. as primary design consultant.

In September 2014, the PANYNJ announced funding for the major redevelopment of the Greenville Yard, to include a new rail container terminal. About 10,000 feet of working track, 32,000 feet of support track and switches, along with infrastructure to support rail-mounted gantry cranes, will be constructed for the ExpressRail terminal, which will initially support 125,000 container lifts a year. The PANYNJ will also build two new rail-to-barge transfer bridges, purchase two new car float barges, each with 18 rail car capacity, and buy four new ultra low emission locomotives, replacing antiquated units. Of the project’s $356 million cost, $320 million will be paid by the agency with the remainder coming from stakeholders. The new facility is expected to become operational in July 2016. The New Jersey Department of Transportation allocated more than $87 million for 2014-2017 fiscal budget for the project and other related word, including land acquisition. Construction began in December 2016, with completion expected in 2018. The first phase of the project, with four tracks and two gantry cranes, opened on January 7, 2019. The second and final phase of the project, with four additional tracks bringing the total number of tracks to eight, was opened on June 17, 2019. GCT Global Container Terminals operated the yard until CMA CGM took over port operations in mid-2023.

== History ==
=== Pennsylvania Railroad ===
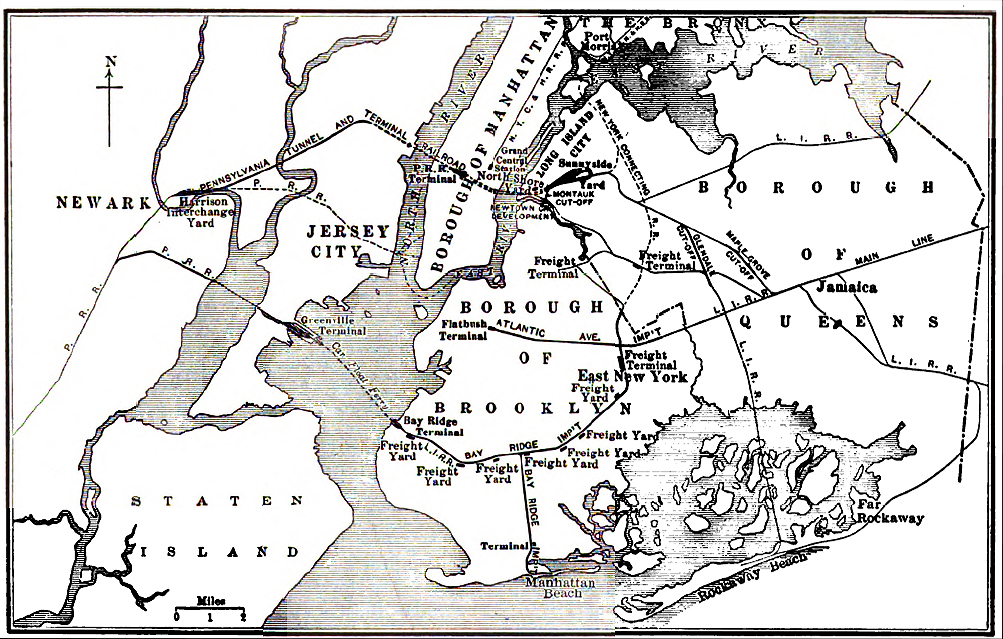
1912 PRR map showing the Greenville Terminal and its car float operations, also the current crossing

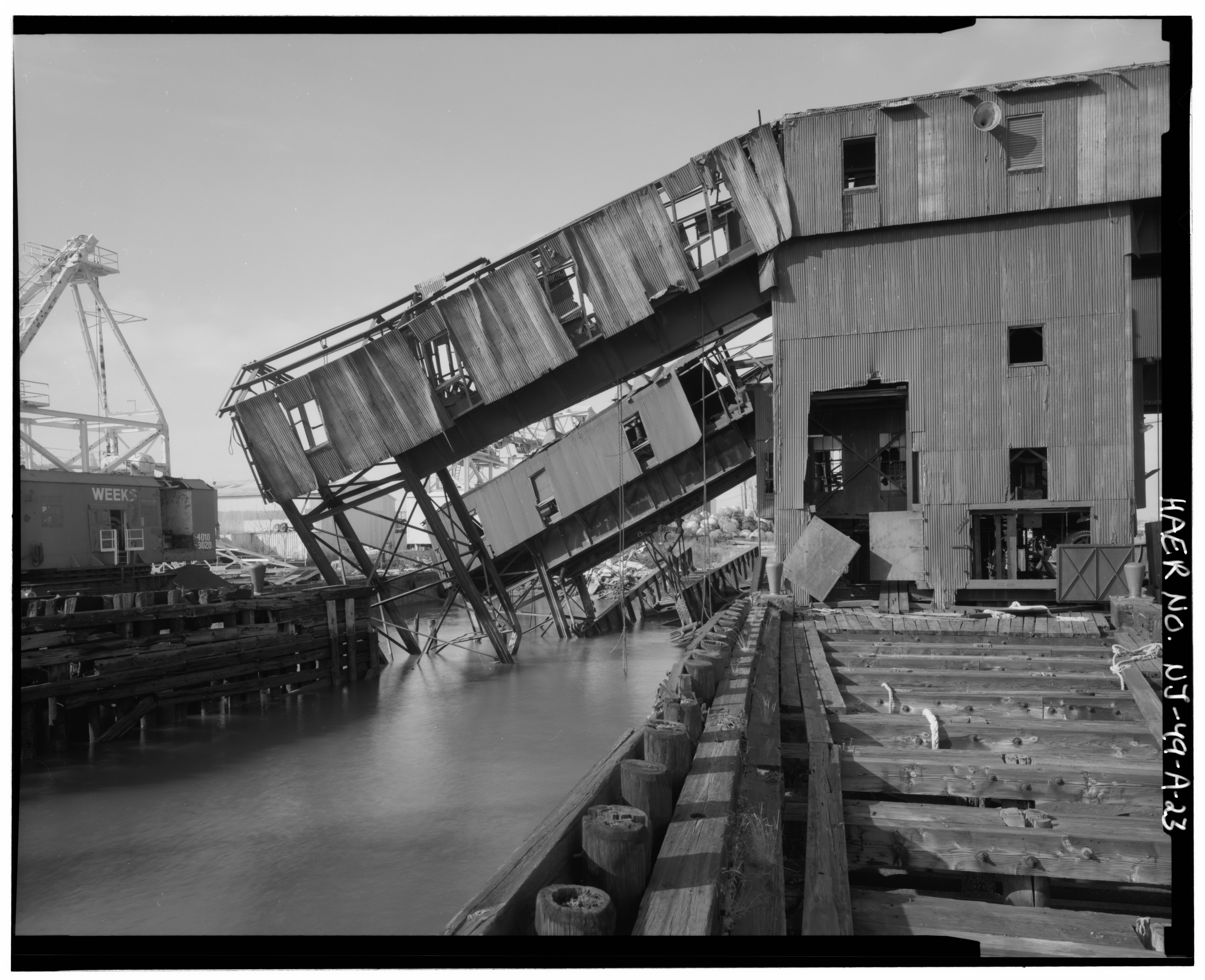
Bridge No. 14, decades later, partially collapsed

The Greenville Yard takes its name from the former town of Greenville which became part of Jersey City in the 1860s. The yard also lends its name to a nearby industrial park and distribution center. The yard was first developed in 1904 by the Pennsylvania Railroad, and opened with three based on designs of their bridges at Harsimus Cove. They were referred to as No.11, No.12, and No.13. A number of different organizations were involved in its construction: the Steele & Condict Company of New Jersey manufactured the bridge mechanisms, Henry Steers, Inc. did the foundation, pile racks, bridges, and aprons, while the Cooper-Wigand-Cooke Company and the R.P. & J.H. Staats Company of New York jointly erected the bridge superstructure and transfer machinery housing. The new designs utilized electric motors and controls, and a live load counterweight system. PRR set the industry standard for electrified lift bridges with this design; virtually identical bridges were built in the Port of New York and New Jersey area by the New York, New Haven and Hartford Railroad at their Oak Point Yard in 1908, and the Baltimore and Ohio Railroad at their St. George, Staten Island terminal in 1912. A fourth bridge, No.14, was added in 1910, and a fifth, No.10, in 1924. This was constructed by the Schuylkill Bridge Works Division of the Lewis F. Shoemaker & Company.

On January 1, 1931, a short-circuit caused the wooden superstructure of Bridge No.10 to ignite. Within 15 minutes, two more superstructures and the wooden transfer house were ablaze. As there were no roads to the yard, land-based firefighters had to be brought in a mile by rail. There were 50 firefighters and land, and 20 tugs and fire boats. The only injury reported was a fractured ankle, when the employee jumped down a burning stairwell to survive. The car float and 25 cars owned by the NYNH&H that were docked at Bridge No.10 were a total loss, while three other car floats that sustained varying damage were salvageable. All five bridges were put out of service, and freight was rerouted through PRR's other facilities in Harsimus Cove and Exchange Place, in addition to the Lehigh Valley Railroad's terminal on the Morris Canal Basin. The fire cost the PRR $500,000 and $1 million, which in the 2014 value of the dollar would be between $7.772 million and $15.55 million. It put unemployed 300 workers, although within two days they were put to work repairing bridges at Greenville or working at other PRR yards in the area. The American Bridge Company was contracted to rebuild the bridges, and were built functionally identical to the previous bridges; the design of the bridges were still extremely efficient, and the only major change was the elimination of any wood. Bridges Nos. 10, 13, and 14 were initially repaired, with No.12 being cleared for rebuilding in 1939. Because of World War II, however, the plan was suspended indefinitely. A new bridge, No.9, was later put into service in November 9, 1943 to satisfy traffic being generated by the Brooklyn Navy Yard and Brooklyn Army Terminal across the bay. These two facilities were most often the last place troops and supplies went before embarking to Europe.

=== PANYNJ ===
In May 2010, the Port Authority announced that it would purchase the Greenville Yard and build a new barge-to-rail facility there, as well as improving the existing rail car float system. The barge-to-rail facility is expected to handle an estimated 60,000 to 90,000 containers of solid waste per year from New York City, eliminating up to 360,000 trash truck trips a year. The authority's board authorized $118.1 million for the overall project. The New Jersey Department of Transportation allocated more than $70 million in it 2012 fiscal budget for improvement to the barge and bridge operations.

In November 2011, the Port Authority contracted HDR, Inc. as prime design consultant. Work includes rehabilitating the railyard and waterfront structures, including a rail barge and transfer bridge, demolishing two other bridges, designing a new barge and two new bridges, and adding 10,000 feet of track. The project is expected to take 5 years. The site will include a large new intermodal rail terminal to be called ExpressRail Port Jersey.

On October 29, 2012, Hurricane Sandy caused major damage to the Greenville facility, undermining the float bridge gantries and sinking one of the car floats. The 81-year-old gantry structures were in such bad condition that they had to be demolished. The working float bridge at Bush Terminal was transferred by barge to Greenville to restore rail float service. Previously plans called for the gantries to be demolished in phases and replaced by two new float bridges and a barge transfer station.

On September 17, 2014, the Port Authority announced that it was funding a major redevelopment of the Greenville Yard, to include a new ExpressRail container terminal servicing the Global Marine Terminal. About 10,000 feet of working track, 32,000 feet of support track and switches, along with infrastructure to support rail-mounted gantry cranes, will be constructed. The new terminal will initially support 125,000 container lifts a year. The Port Authority will also build two new rail to barge transfer bridges, purchase two new car float barges, each with 18 rail car capacity, and buy four new KLW SE10B ultra low emission locomotives, replacing antiquated units. Of the project’s $356 million cost, $320 million will be paid by the Port Authority, with the remainder coming from stakeholders. The new facility was expected to become operational in July 2016.

The two barges were delivered in 2017 and 2018 and four of the eight tracks of the new intermodal transfer facility opened on January 7, 2019, with the remaining four tracks opening on June 17, 2019. The two rail mounts gantry cranes span the eight working tracks and cantilever over two truck lanes on each side. The new intermodal container transfer facility will have a capacity of 250,000 container lifts per year, increasing the port's overall capacity to 1.5 million lifts per year.

== See also ==
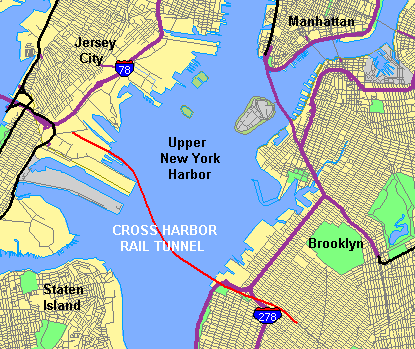
The route of a proposed Cross-Harbor Rail Tunnel across the Upper New York Bay and under Grenville Yard. Port Jersey is the upper of two man-made piers extending into the bay, the lower being MOTBY

- Oak Island Yard
- Cross-Harbor Rail Tunnel
- Rail freight transportation in New York City and Long Island
- Geography of New York–New Jersey Harbor Estuary
- List of rail yards
- Weeks Marine, adjacent to the yard
