= R156 =

R156 can refer to:

- The R156 road (Ireland)
- The MPI MP8AC-3 locomotive, designated R156 by the New York City Subway system, its first customer.
