= South Brooklyn Railway =

Railroad in New York City

Coordinates: 40.6545436°N 74.0099555°W

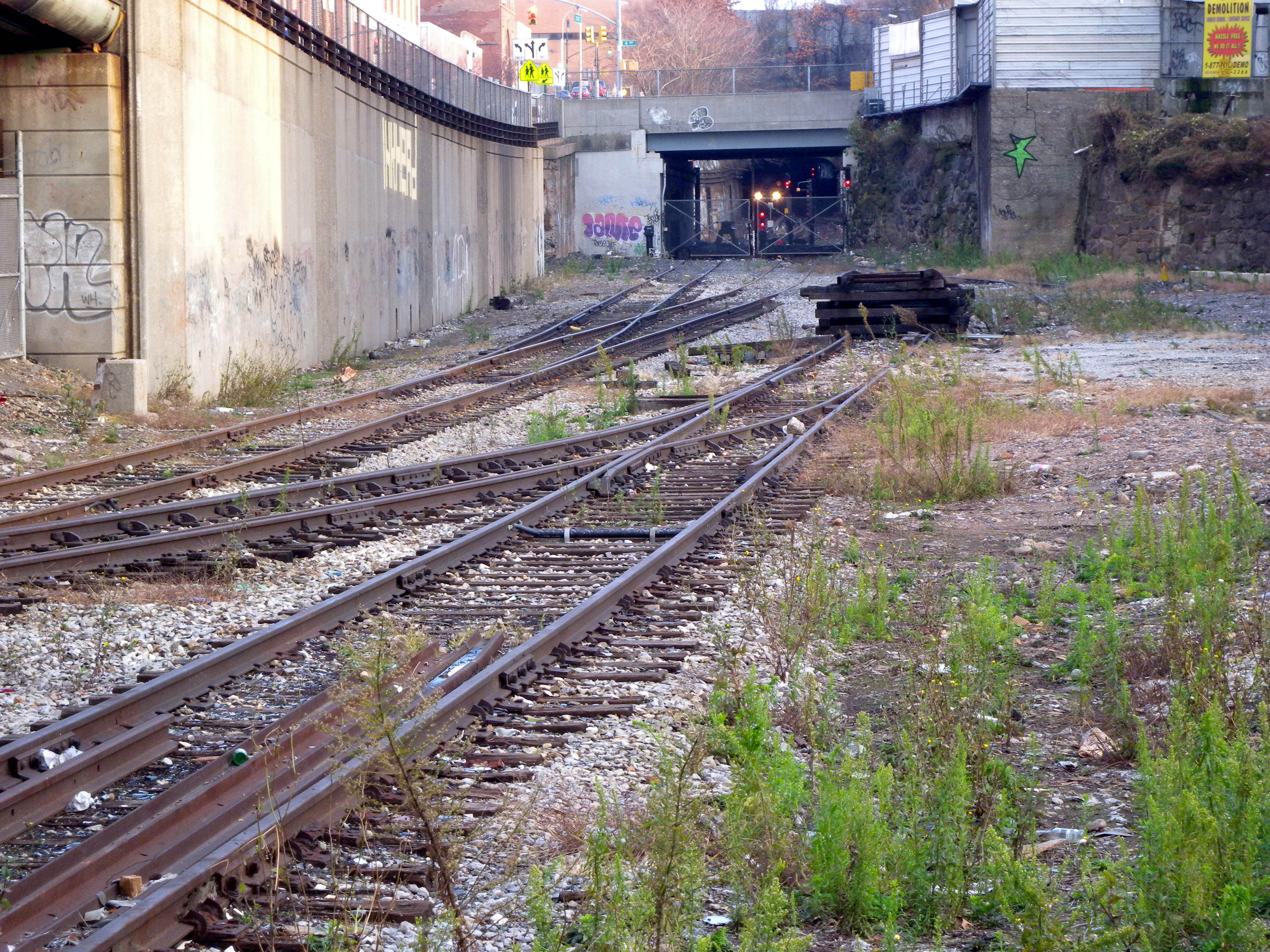
- South Brooklyn Railway junction, under Exit 23 of the Gowanus Expressway

Overview
- Status: Operating
- Owner: City of New York
- Locale: Sunset Park, Brooklyn, New York City
- Termini: South Brooklyn Marine Terminal (west); 36th–38th Street Yard (east)

Service
- Type: Freight rail
- System: None; connected to New York City Subway
- Operator(s): New York City Transit Authority
- Rolling stock: 2 GE47T diesels

History
- Opened: 1887

Technical
- Character: Freight railroad
- Track gauge: 4 ft 8 1/2 in (1,435 mm) standard gauge

The South Brooklyn Railway (reporting mark SBK) is a railroad in the New York City borough of Brooklyn. It is owned by the government of New York City and operated by the New York City Transit Authority. Its original main line ran parallel to 38th Street from the Upper New York Bay to McDonald Avenue, and south on McDonald Avenue to the Coney Island Yards, mostly underneath the former Culver Shuttle and the IND Culver Line of the New York City Subway.

Parts of the original line still exist. The section between the BMT West End Line's Ninth Avenue station and its interchange yard at Second Avenue and 39th Street is still open. The section under the IND Culver Line has been paved over. Today, it runs only from the 36th–38th Street Yard in the east to the South Brooklyn Marine Terminal in the west.

== Private operation ==
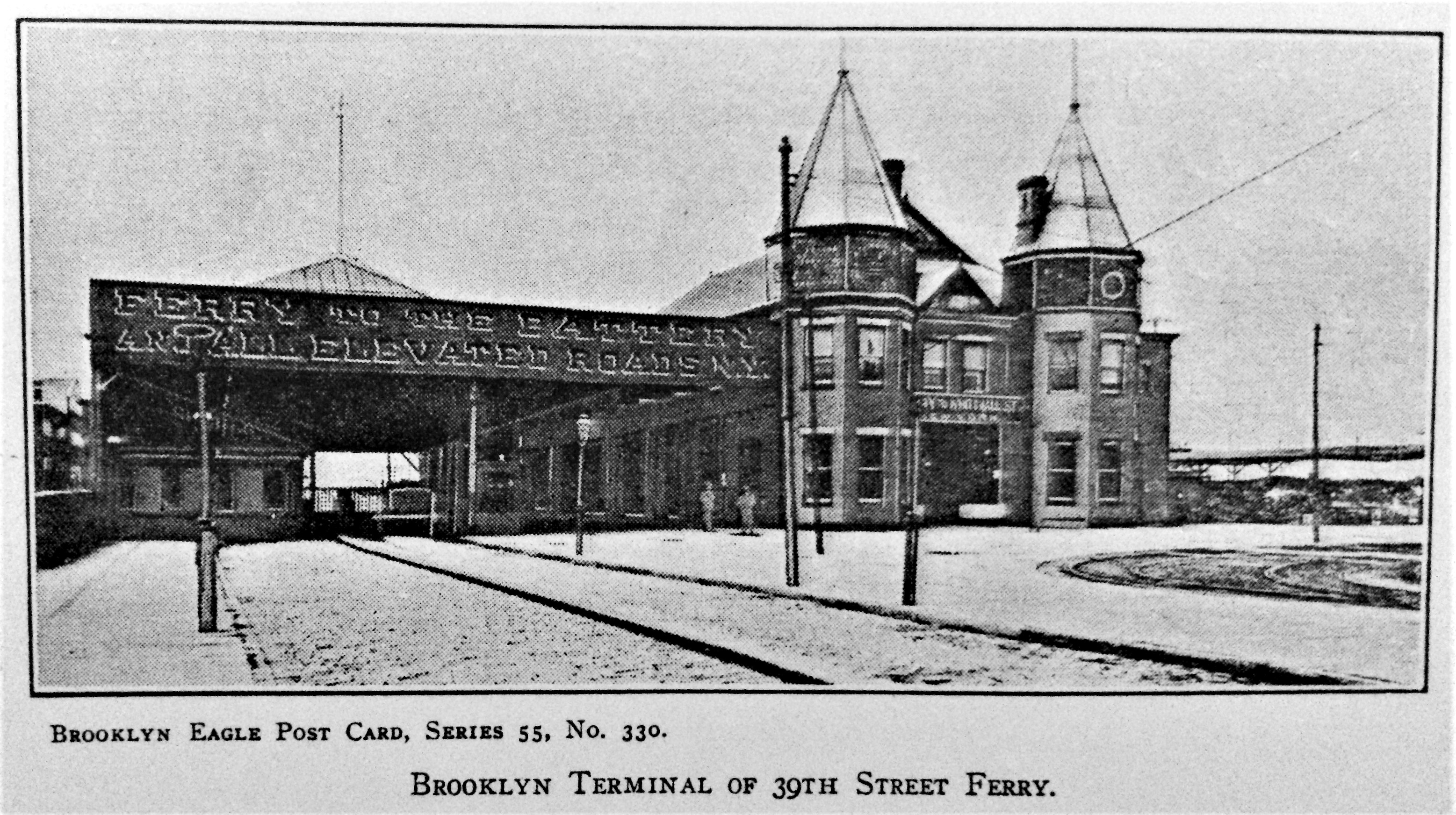
1893 photo of the 39th Street Brooklyn Ferry Terminal owned by SBR&T.

The South Brooklyn Railroad and Terminal Company was incorporated September 30, 1887 to build from the end of the Brooklyn, Bath and West End Railroad (West End Line) at 38th Street and 9th Avenue northwest to the foot of 38th Street, and was leased to the BB&WE, allowing BB&WE trains to run to the 39th Street Ferry. The land purchases were completed in 1892, and the South Brooklyn Railway & Terminal Company built a terminal station and freight house at Third Avenue. The company was not a "railroad" in the strictest sense, as it did not own any rail vehicles, but instead owned several city blocks to lease to other railroads that wished to connect to the ferry terminal at 39th Street.

The Prospect Park and South Brooklyn Railroad connected the Prospect Park and Coney Island Railroad (Culver Line) to the South Brooklyn Railroad in 1890, and the latter was bought by the Long Island Rail Road in 1893. The LIRR obtained the South Brooklyn Railway & Terminal Company lease on the land in 1897 and used steam powered locomotives. As these locomotives could not be used for freight operations, the line was electrified in 1899; however, the LIRR occasionally ran steam-powered special trains to the Brooklyn Jockey Club Racetrack at Kings Highway and Ocean Parkway. After foreclosure of the South Brooklyn Railroad & Terminal Company in December 1899, the company was reorganized as the South Brooklyn Railway on January 13, 1900.

The Brooklyn Rapid Transit Company acquired the railway on August 31, 1902, but the LIRR still ran the trains until 1903 or 1905. After the cessation of LIRR operations, the BRT started passenger service and transferred freight service to a subsidiary, Brooklyn Heights Railroad, which provided freight service with three locomotives, with a fourth delivered in 1907. It carried mail for the U.S. Post Office Department, as well as lumber, cement, sand, stone, ashes, pipe, marble for headstones, and granite for curbstones.

At its greatest extent, the line ran along Second Avenue, then merged with the BMT West End Line from Fourth Avenue to the Ninth Avenue station. From there, it ran at street level under the BMT Culver Line down McDonald Avenue to Avenue X.

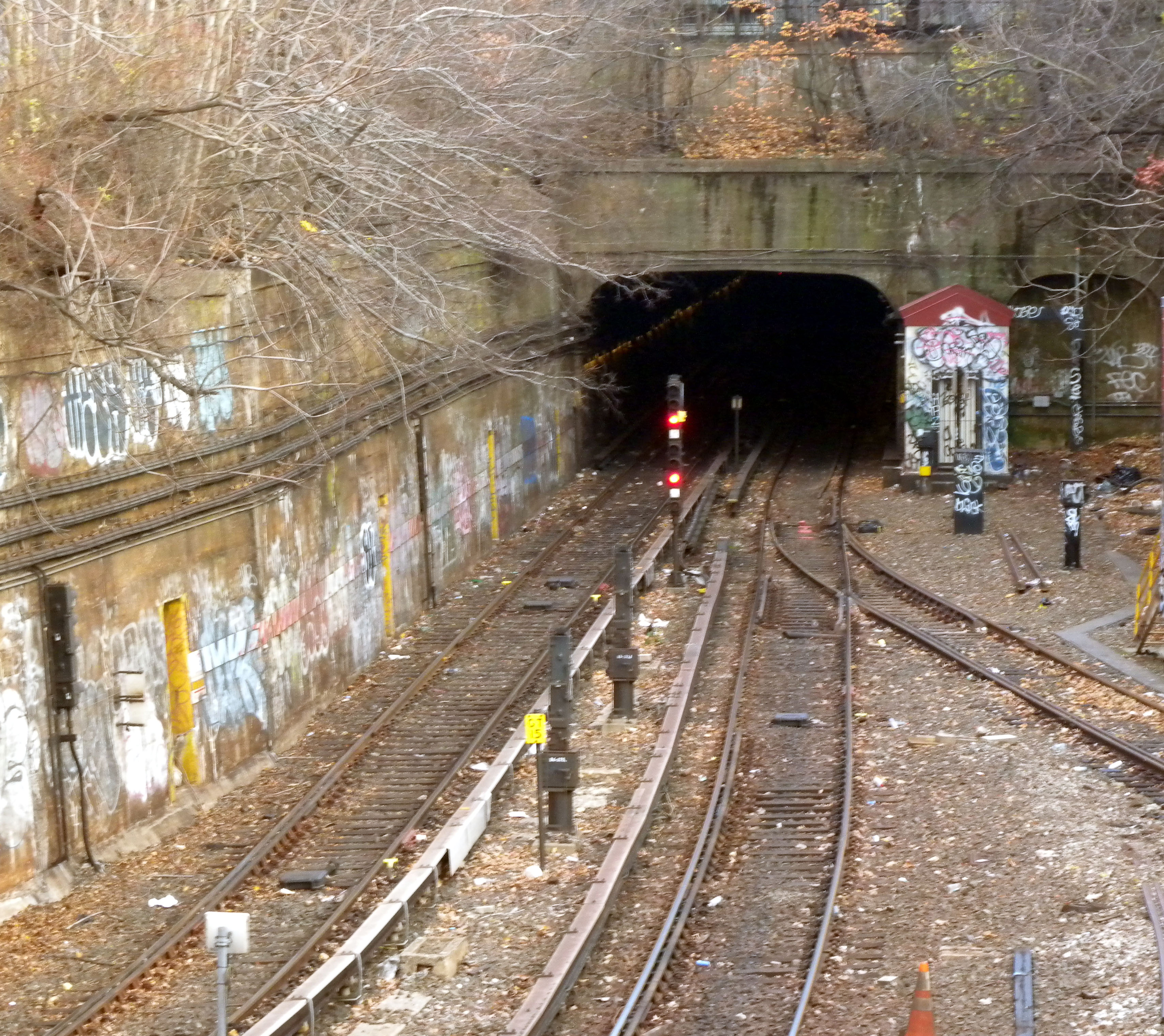
Another view of the SBK merge with BMT West End Line

On February 28, 1907, the South Brooklyn Railway and the Brooklyn Heights Railroad were split from each other, but both were still owned by the BRT. The South Brooklyn Railway was a separate subsidiary company that carried both passengers and freight, to avoid the BRT from being operated under Interstate Commerce Commission regulations. The Brooklyn Heights Railroad leased the Prospect Park and Coney Island Railroad, which included the Prospect Park and South Brooklyn Railroad, giving it a line to Coney Island.

In 1909, the South Brooklyn Railway was granted a request by the Public Services Commission to discontinue the use of the Third Avenue freight yard and station, on the Prospect Park and Coney Island Railroad's property. The freight house, which was leased from the LIRR, was deteriorating, and the South Brooklyn Railway did not want to build a new one on LIRR property, instead preferring to build a replacement on the property of the New York and Sea Beach Railroad, using Sea Beach trackage to access the new terminal. The South Brooklyn Railway bought another locomotive. In 1913, all of the BRT's lines were reorganized, and all ownership of freight operations was transferred to the South Brooklyn Railway.

The location of the South Brooklyn Railway helped in the construction of new BRT subway and elevated lines in Brooklyn, as materials could be brought in via its trackage. A temporary connection at 38th Street and Fourth Avenue allowed South Brooklyn Railway equipment to enter the BMT Fourth Avenue Line construction site. In June 1922, the South Brooklyn Railway bought much of the LIRR-owned Prospect Park & Coney Island Railroad. By 1923, the Prospect Park & Coney Island Railroad and the New York & Coney Island Railroad were merged into the South Brooklyn Railway. The BRT filed bankruptcy that year and was reorganized into the Brooklyn–Manhattan Transit Corporation, which still operated the South Brooklyn Railway.

== City operation ==
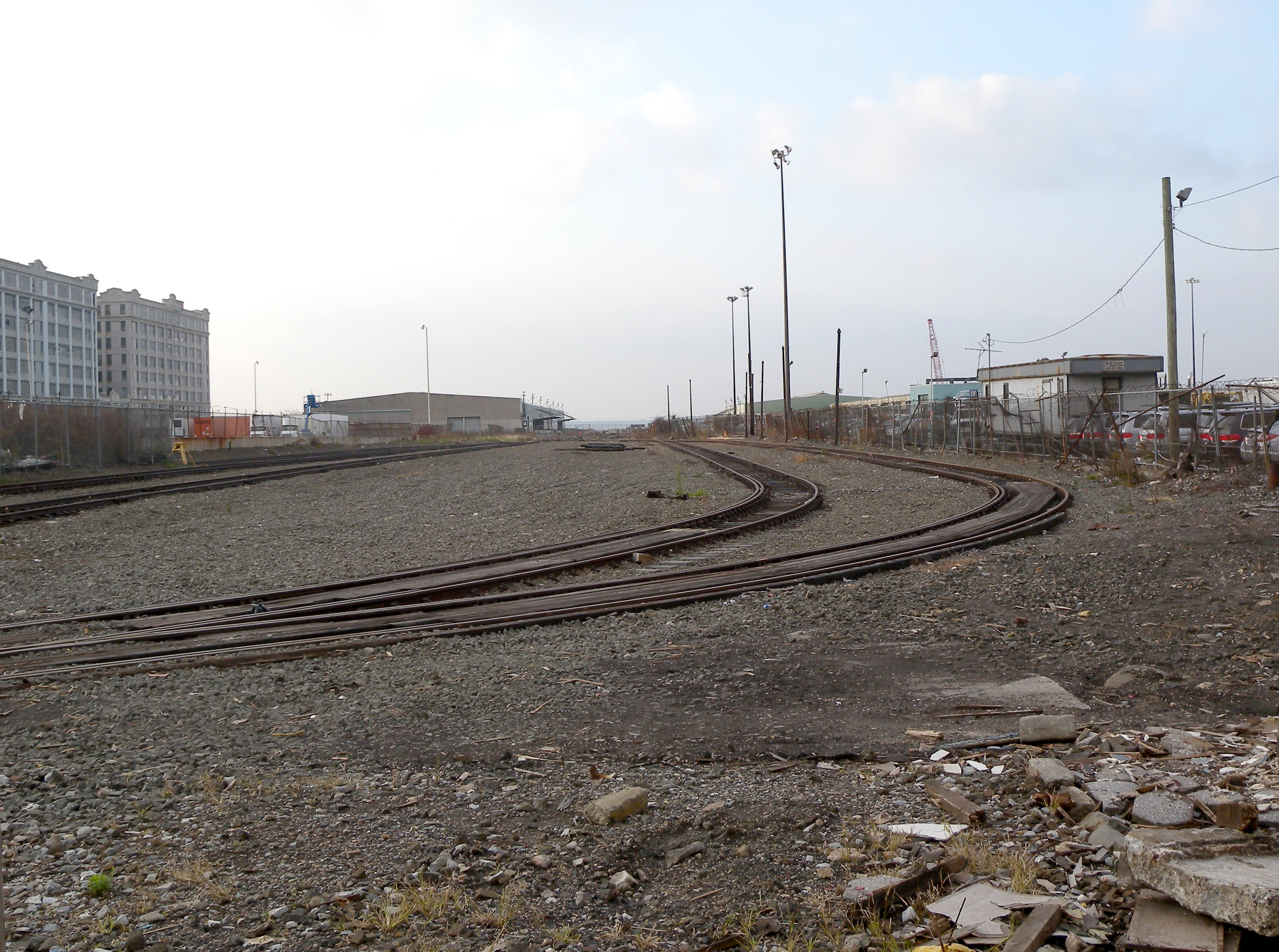
Second Avenue interchange yard

The South Brooklyn Railway, along with the other non-rapid transit properties of the BMT, was transferred to the New York City Board of Transportation on June 1, 1940. That year, freight traffic went up significantly due to the start of World War II. The South Brooklyn Railway also got some trucks to deliver incoming freight directly to customers. In 1946, after the war, South Brooklyn Railway purchased two Whitcomb ex-U.S. Army diesel locomotives.

Operations were transferred to the New York City Transit Authority on June 15, 1953. Streetcar service on McDonald Avenue ended on October 31, 1956 and thereafter the South Brooklyn Railway started using the surface trackage solely for freight. In 1960, two more diesel electric locomotives were bought. On December 27, 1961, the line was de-electrified, due to the high cost of refurbishing the overhead trolley wire. Electric locomotives #4, 5, 6, and 7, which had third rail conduction shoes, were given to the NYCTA for subway and elevated operation.

The switches at Kensington Junction were locked so that the branch was completely separated up to the Ninth Avenue & 20th Street Depot, which thereby became an unneeded facility because passenger streetcar operation had ended. At the same time, freight usage of the South Brooklyn Railway declined because of the increasing use of semi-trailer trucks. The McDonald Avenue trackage was no longer in use by 1978, and paved over by 1991. After the closure of the McDonald Avenue tracks, the South Brooklyn Railway's freight operations were moved from the Second Avenue yard to the 36th–38th Street Yard, where it still operates. In 1994, the last non-NYCTA customer on the line closed; the South Brooklyn Railway was then used almost exclusively for subway connections to the LIRR Bay Ridge Branch via the South Brooklyn Marine Terminal, Bush Terminal, and Industry City.

== Current status ==
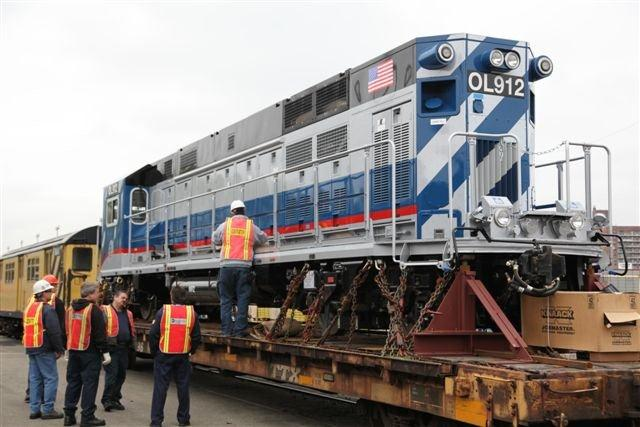
The primary function of the South Brooklyn Railway is the occasional delivery of new rolling stock for the subway, such as this R156 work locomotive.

The South Brooklyn Railway provides one of only two track connections between the New York City Subway and the rest of the American rail network. During the 1988 and 1999 reconstruction of the subway tracks on the Williamsburg Bridge, this connection allowed trains from the J/Z, L and M services, which were otherwise isolated during that period, to travel to Coney Island Yard for major work. At the other mainline rail connection at the Linden Shops, subway trains traveled via the Bay Ridge Branch of the Long Island Rail Road to the Brooklyn Army Terminal. From there, the at-grade New York Cross Harbor Railroad brought the cars up to the interchange yard at Second Avenue, where the South Brooklyn Railway took them to Coney Island Yard via the BMT West End Line.

The South Brooklyn Railway has two locomotives, N1 and N2, a pair of GE 47T Diesels. They can also be used on the subway when not needed for the SBK.

A refurbishment of the interchange with New York New Jersey Rail, LLC at the South Brooklyn Marine Terminal Second Avenue Yard was completed in May 2012. A new ramp was installed at the 38th Street Yard at Fourth Avenue to allow receipt of new R156 locomotives and other subway rolling stock that were delivered on flat cars.

== Locomotive roster ==
Unit No.	Model of locomotive
SBK N1	GE 47T switcher
SBK N2	GE 47T switcher
SBK 5	Steeplecab
SBK 6	Steeplecab
SBK 7	Steeplecab
SBK 9	65-ton Whitcomb
SBK 12	GE 70-ton switcher
SBK 13	GE 70-ton switcher
SBK 9425	Boxcab
