= South Brooklyn Marine Terminal =

Industrial complex in Brooklyn, New York

Coordinates: 40°39′30″N 74°00′40″W

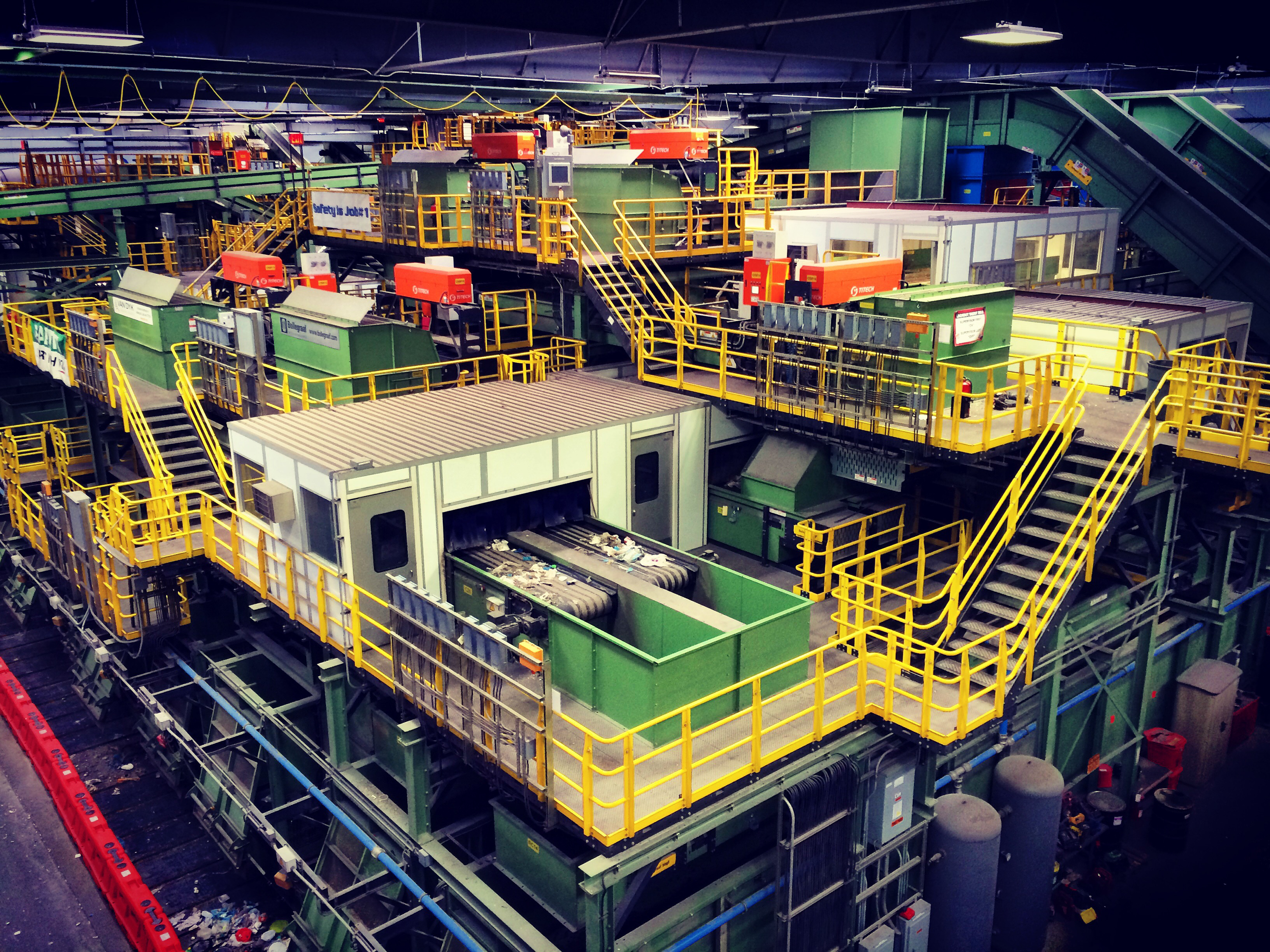
Sorters for recycling

The South Brooklyn Marine Terminal (SBMT) is an intermodal shipping, warehousing, and manufacturing complex in the Port of New York and New Jersey. It is located along the Upper New York Bay, between 29th and 39th Streets in the Sunset Park and Greenwood Heights neighborhoods of Brooklyn in New York City. Bush Terminal and Industry City surround the site to the south and east, respectively. A recycling and waste transfer facility managed by Sims Metal Management is a major tenant. In May 2018, the city contracted partners to activate the largely unused terminal. In 2024, major construction commenced of a 73-acre (30 ha) facility supporting the development of the Empire Wind 1 offshore wind farm.

== Early ferry service ==
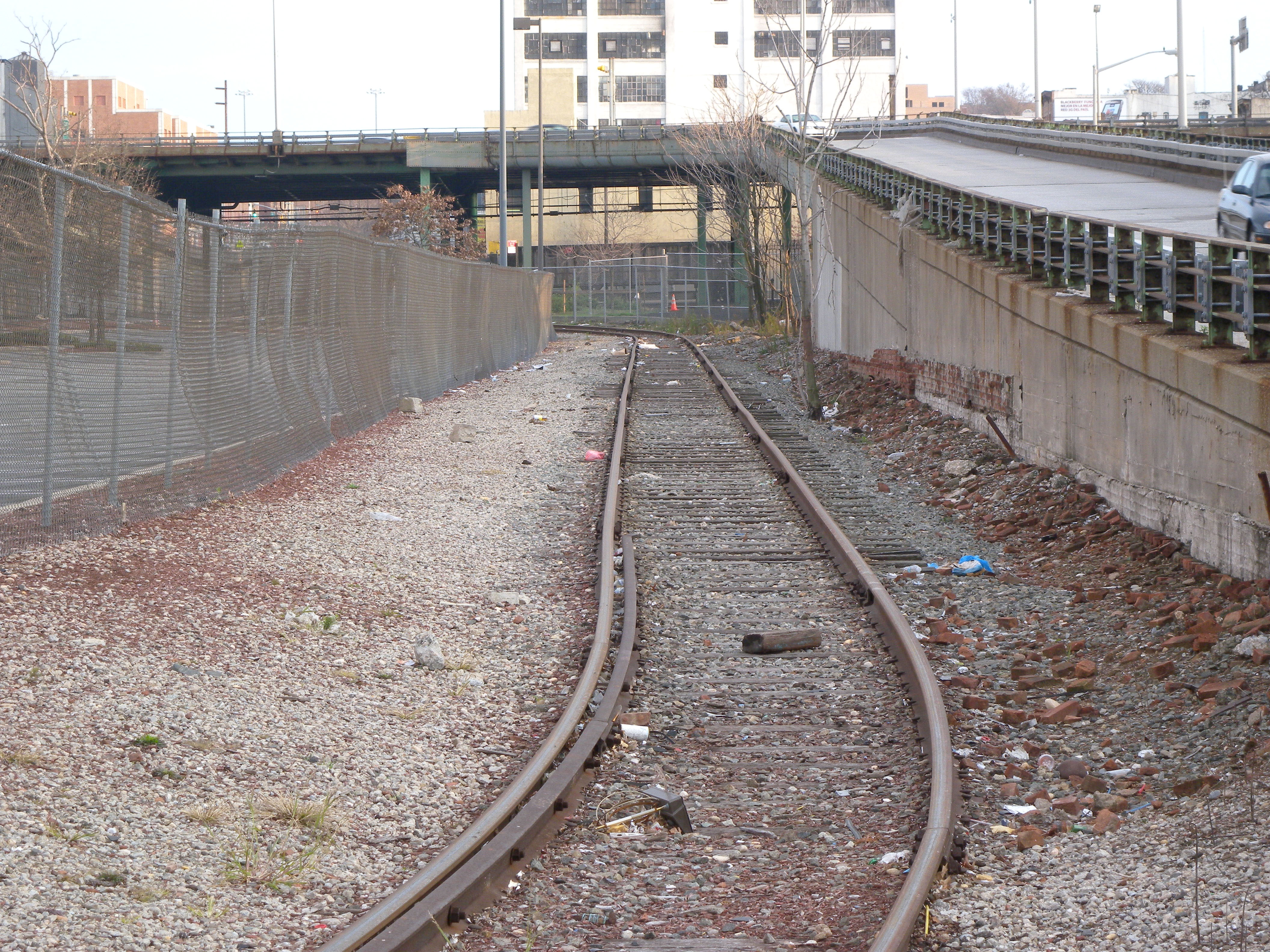
Connector from waterfront to 38th Street Yard and the South Brooklyn Railway

The New York and South Brooklyn Ferry operated a ferry from the Battery Maritime Building (formerly known as Municipal Ferry Pier) to the South Brooklyn/39th Street Ferry Terminal, where rail transfer (to the South Brooklyn Railway) was possible until 1935.

Formerly, a Staten Island Ferry route ran between the ferry slip at 39th Street within Bush Terminal, and the St. George Terminal in Staten Island. The ferry route was discontinued in 1946 after a fire at St. George Terminal.

== Rail service ==
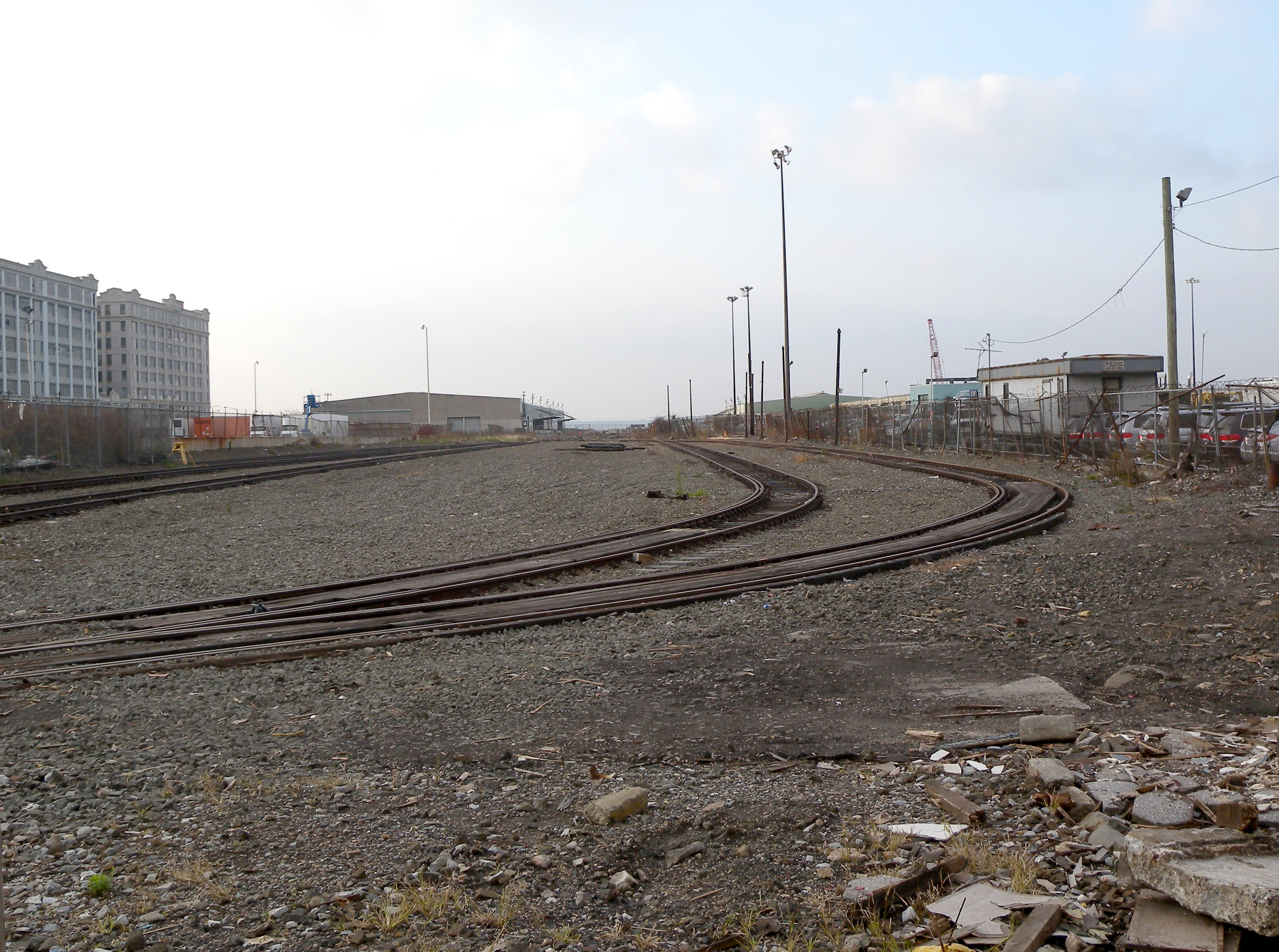
2nd Avenue Yard is located on the marine terminal

Adjacent to the Bush Terminal it is served by car float and transloading activities of New York New Jersey Rail via the 65th Street Yard which also connects to the Bay Ridge Branch, operated by the New York Connecting Railroad. Rail infrastructure improvements along 1st Avenue completed in 2012 connected the yard to SBMT. Other investments in infrastructure included a new break-bulk rail spur along the 39th Street shed, two new rail endings for auto rack transloading, and a new rail connection to the SIMS facility at the 29th Street Pier. SBMT is also connected along the South Brooklyn Railway (ROW) to 36th–38th Street Yard. In 2012, the interchange with New York New Jersey Rail, LLC at Second Avenue was refurbished and a new ramp was installed at the 38th Street Yard at Fourth Avenue to allow receipt of new R156 locomotives and other subway rolling stock that are delivered on flat cars.

== Waste management ==
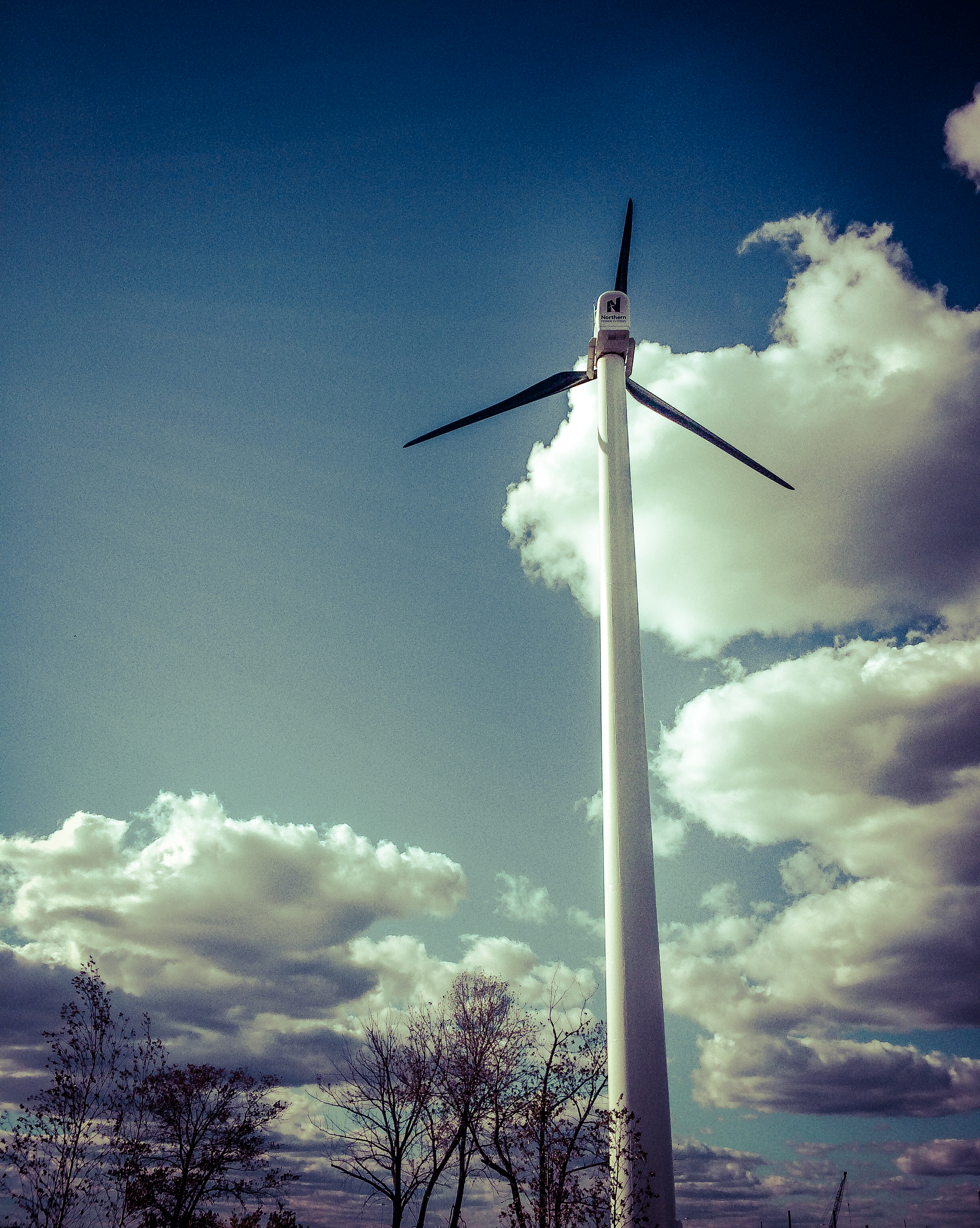
The South Brooklyn Marine Terminal Wind Turbine at the Sims Municipal Recycling Facility in 2015

Sims Metal Management subsidiary Sims Municipal Recycling (SMR) managed construction of a new 11-acre recycling center at SBMT from 2010 to 2013. SMR worked with geotechnical engineers to develop structural fill blends using “mole rock” from NYC tunneling projects mixed with recycled glass aggregate (RGA). More than 5,000 tons of RGA were blended with 20,000 tons of mole rock and used to elevate sections of the site by 4 feet, thereby protecting buildings and equipment against sea level rise and storm surges.

=== Wind turbine ===
In January 2015, SIMS inaugurated the city's only commercial-scale wind turbine at the recycling center. Built by Northern Power Systems at the cost of about $750,000, the 160 ft (49 m) tall turbine has the capacity to produce 100 kilowatts, or 4% of the center's power needs.

== Offshore wind port ==
In January 2021, NY Governor Andrew Cuomo announced that the site would be developed as an offshore wind port including a wind turbine assembly plant to be partially funded by New York State. Turbines manufactured there will be used in constructing three offshore wind farms off the east end of Long Island. South Fork Wind Farm, Beacon Wind and Sunrise Wind are projected to be supplied by 2025 from the new plant, built with $200 million in state funding and $200 million in matching grants. Part of a $29 billion 'Green Initiative' plan for NYS. The project is expected to create 1,200 new manufacturing jobs in Sunset Park.

Groundbreaking was held in 2024 at the commencement of a 73-acre construction project to support the development of the Empire Wind 1 offshore wind farm. The existing buildings on the site have been demolished and will be replaced with a staging and pre-assembly site for the turbine components of Empire Wind 1. The facility will also include an onshore substation to connect 810 MW of wind power to the Gowanus substation, and Empire Wind 1’s long-term Operations & Maintenance Base, which will include a control room that measures turbine data and monitors the project around-the-clock.

== Auto processing ==
Auto processing, the customization of imported automobiles, is done at the terminal at a scaled-down assembly plant where much of the work is done by hand using simple tools. Quality control inspections are done, repairs are made, and accessories – such as floor mats, GPS systems, satellite radios, alloy wheels and roof racks – are installed. The facility at SBMT was operated by the Axis Group. which filed bankruptcy in 2012. Plans by the New York City Economic Development Corporation (NYCEDC) to redevelop and expand the auto processing have been bogged down since 2014.

== Sustainable South Brooklyn Marine Terminal ==
The SBMT was designated as part of America's Marine Highway in 2015. In 2018, Sustainable South Brooklyn Marine Terminal (SSBMT) was established and operations turned over the Red Hook Container Terminal operators.

== 1956 pier fire at 35th Street ==
On December 3, 1956, the area was the site of one of the largest explosions in New York City history. A fire on the Luckenbach Pier at the end of 35th Street reached 37,000 pounds of highly explosive Primacord, resulting in an explosion that killed 10 people and injured 247.

== See also ==
- List of North American ports
- List of ports in the United States
- Red Hook Container Terminal
- Rail freight transportation in New York City and Long Island
- Vision 2020: New York City Comprehensive Waterfront Plan
