= Emergent City =

- Directed by: Kelly Anderson; Jay Arthur Sterrenberg
- Produced by: Kelly Anderson; Brenda Avila
- Edited by: Jay Arthur Sterrenberg
- Music by: Gisela Fullà-Silvestre
- Release date: June 11, 2024 (Tribeca Festival)
- Running time: 95 minutes
- Country: United States
- Languages: English; Chinese; Spanish

Emergent City is a 2024 American documentary film which explores the debate over the redevelopment of Industry City in Brooklyn, New York. It was directed by Kelly Anderson and Jay Arthur Sterrenberg.

== Reception ==
On the review aggregator website Rotten Tomatoes, 100% of 12 critics' reviews are positive.

Matt Zoller Seitz of RogerEbert.com gave the film three and a half out of four stars and wrote that it "is an old-school documentary that tells a story by presenting and arranging information and expecting you to meet it halfway rather than having everything spoon-fed to you."
