= Industry City =

Industrial complex in Brooklyn, New York

Coordinates: 40°39′21″N 74°00′29″W

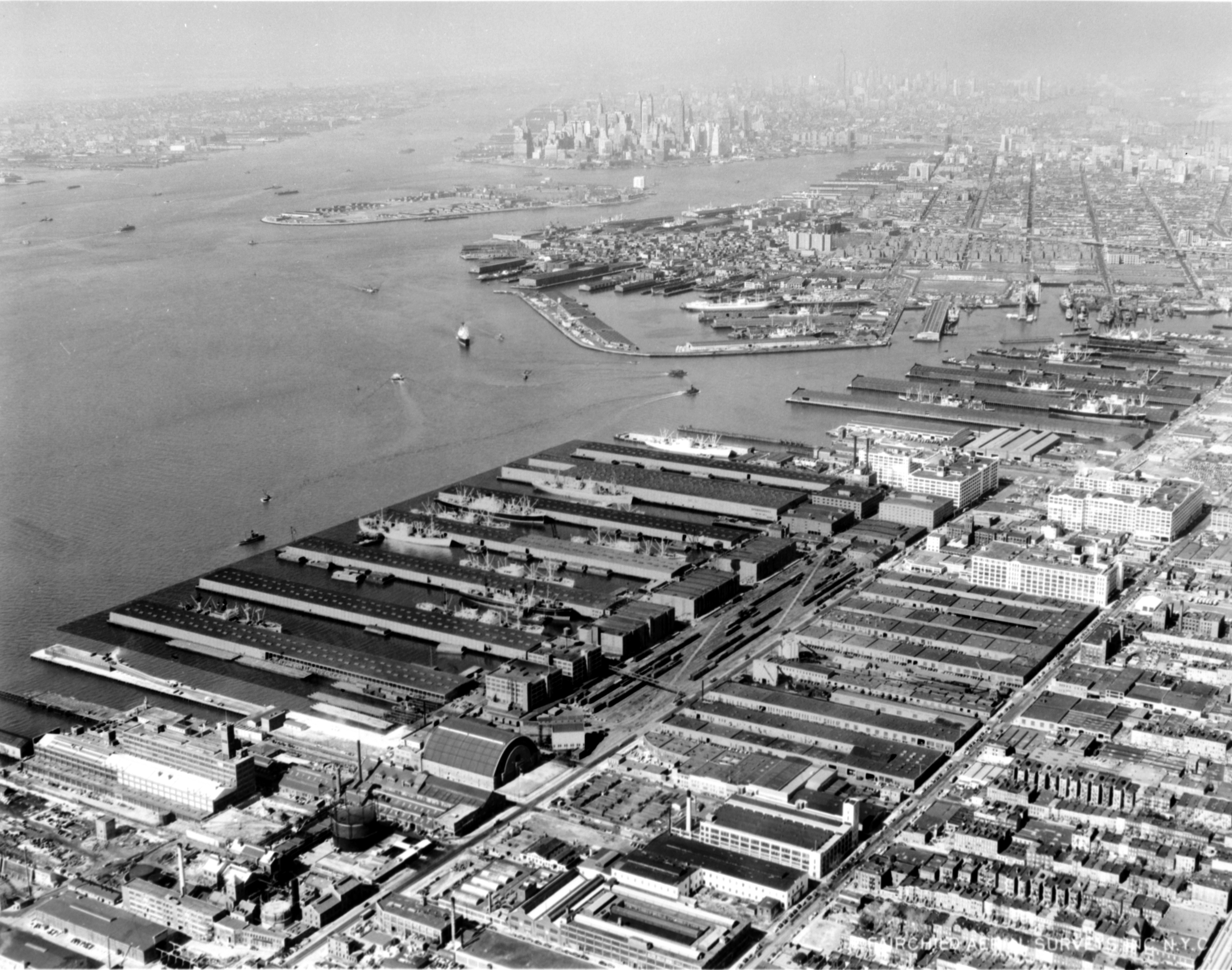
Bush Terminal in 1958, looking north, with Lower Manhattan in the distance

Location in New York City

Industry City (also Bush Terminal) (Note: The complex was originally known as "Bush Terminal" but in the 1950s also became known as "Industry City". The term "Industry City" also refers to the privately owned complex between 32nd and 41st Streets, while the term "Bush Terminal" also refers to the publicly operated complex between 40th and 51st Streets.) is a historic intermodal shipping, warehousing, and manufacturing complex on the Upper New York Bay waterfront in the Sunset Park neighborhood of Brooklyn, New York City, United States. The northern portion, named "Industry City", hosts over 650 office, industrial, creative and manufacturing tenants across 6,000,000 square feet (560,000 m^{2}) of space between 32nd and 41st Streets, and is operated by a private consortium including Jamestown LP. The southern portion, known as "Bush Terminal", is located between 40th and 51st Streets and is operated by the New York City Economic Development Corporation (NYCEDC) as a garment manufacturing complex.

Founded by Bush Terminal Company head Irving T. Bush in the early 20th century, Bush Terminal was the first facility of its kind in New York City and the largest multi-tenant industrial property in the United States. The warehouses were built between 1892 and 1910, the railroad from 1896 to 1915, and the factory lofts between 1905 and 1925. During World War I, Bush Terminal was used as a United States Navy base, and returned to private ownership after the war. At its peak, Bush Terminal covered 200 acres (81 hectares), bounded by Gowanus Bay to the west and north, Third Avenue to the east, 27th Street to the north, and 50th Street to the south.

The surrounding area declined after World War II, and by the 1970s, the ports in Bush Terminal had been filled. The complex was rebranded as Industry City during the post-war years, though the Bush Terminal name remained in popular use. In the 1970s and 1980s, sections of Bush Terminal were demolished or converted for other uses, including a shopping mall, a federal prison, a privately operated manufacturing and commercial complex, and a garment manufacturing district operated by the NYCEDC.

Today, the Bush Terminal site comprises roughly 71 acres (29 ha), including 16 former factory buildings and 11 warehouses built in the early 20th century. Renovations and expansions began in the 2010s. A major expansion of Industry City, which would add 3,000,000 square feet (280,000 m^{2}) of space to the complex, was announced in 2017. The section of Bush Terminal operated by the NYCEDC is also being renovated into the "Made in NY" campus, a film, TV, and fashion manufacturing complex that was set to open in 2020, but was delayed.

== Description ==
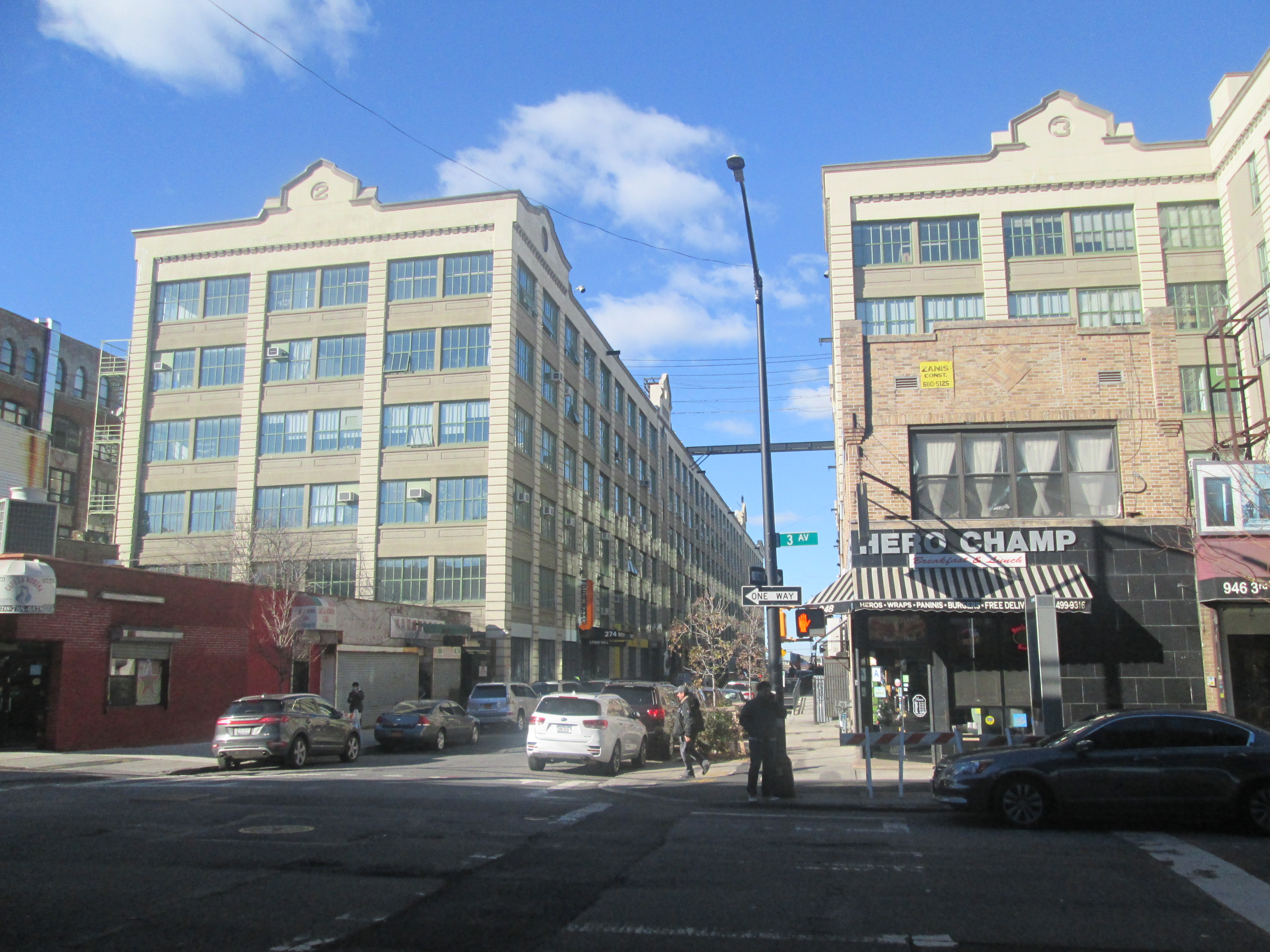
Industry City streetscape

The privately owned Industry City complex includes 16 structures and 35 acres (14 ha) of land on the Brooklyn waterfront, adjacent to New York Harbor. It is subdivided into eight former factory buildings between Second Avenue, 33rd Street, Third Avenue, and 37th Street, numbered 8 to 1 from north to south. Two more buildings, numbered 19 and 20, occupy the block bounded by First Avenue, Second Avenue, 39th Street, and 41st Street. The structures contain a combined 6,000,000 square feet (560,000 m^{2}) of floor space. All of the buildings were part of the Bush Terminal Company's "Industrial Colony", built in the late 1900s and early 1910s.

Directly south of Industry City, between First Avenue, 40th Street, Second Avenue, and 51st Street, is a collection of 11 former warehouses operated by the NYCEDC as part of the Bush Terminal manufacturing complex. These structures were developed by the South Brooklyn Industrial Development Corporation starting in 1989. The campus comprises 36 acres (15 ha) of land and 1,400,000 square feet (130,000 m^{2}) of renovated floor space.

The entire complex was originally called Bush Terminal and formerly stretched further north to 28th Street. The section north of 32nd Street, comprising the former Naval Fleet Supply Base, is no longer part of Bush Terminal. One of the buildings between 29th and 31st Street, called Federal Building No. 2, are a privately owned shopping complex called Liberty View Industrial Plaza. It was bought by Salman Properties in 2011, and before that, it had been vacant since 2000. The site of the other structure, Federal Building No. 1, is occupied by Metropolitan Detention Center, Brooklyn (MDC Brooklyn), which was built in the 1990s. Federal Building No. 1 was demolished in 1993 to make way for MDC Brooklyn.

The South Brooklyn Marine Terminal, also owned by the NYCEDC, occupies the waterfront to the north and west, from 39th to 29th Streets.

=== Factory lofts ===
By 1918, the Bush Terminal Company owned 3,100 feet (940 m) of waterfront in Brooklyn, and the terminal covered 20 waterfront blocks. The complex ultimately encompassed 16 factory buildings between 28th and 37th Streets, and between 39th and 41st Streets. The buildings were outfitted with the most modern amenities available in the 1900s and 1910s, such as fireproof metal facades and a fire sprinkler system. The floors of the loft buildings could carry loads of up to 200 pounds per square foot (980 kg/m^{2}).

The loft buildings had a combined 150 freight elevators. They were mostly U-shaped to facilitate loading at the rail sidings between the two wings of each building. By the 1970s, the facility's buildings had 263,740 window panes in their walls and 138 miles (222 km) of fire sprinklers running within them.

Female railroad workers at Bush Terminal during World War I

==== Bush Terminal Company Building ====
Industry City includes the Bush Terminal Company Building (now Buildings 19 and 20), a loft structure located on Second Avenue between 39th and 40th Streets. Construction on the building started around 1911. It was eight stories tall with three distinct buildings connected in U-shaped manner. The primary structure possessed a common courtyard with wings. The structure had a frontage of 460 feet on the west side of Second Avenue. Its wings ran westward from Second Avenue along 39th Street and 40th Street. It extended 335 feet each to a private street located off the bulkheads. The court measured 210 feet by 55 feet.

The property on which the edifice was erected was purchased in part from the New York Dock Company for $30 million. The building's completion was part of a plan long contemplated by the Bush Terminal Company's president, Irving T. Bush. Its construction coincided with an improvement in the industrial region between First and Second Avenues. The Bush Terminal Company erected structures like this on both sides of Second Avenue.

=== Railroad ===
The Bush Terminal Railroad Company owned about twenty miles (32 km) of track within the terminal by 1917, which had grown to 43 miles (69 km) of track by 1950. The terminal's railroad greatly reduced shippers' cost to haul freight from their facilities to a rail yard. The rail yard could hold about 1,000 freight cars and was six blocks long. The terminal also owned two miles (3.2 km) of double-tracked electric railroad that ran on the streets along Brooklyn's waterfront. The tracks ran along Second Avenue from 28th to 41st Streets and along First Avenue from 41st to 64th Streets, with spurs into every factory building and into the Brooklyn Army Terminal at 58th Street. Eventually, Bush Terminal could handle 50,000 freight railcars at a time.

The tracks connected with the Pennsylvania Railroad's New York Connecting Railroad at 65th Street, south of the Brooklyn Army Terminal. There was also a direct connection to the Brooklyn Rapid Transit Company's trackage at 39th Street, which is now operated by the South Brooklyn Railway. Around 1913, there were plans to extend the railroad northward along the Brooklyn waterfront via the "Marginal Elevated Railway". The railroad would have used an elevated viaduct, similar to the High Line in Manhattan, between Bush Terminal and the piers at Fulton Ferry Landing (now Brooklyn Bridge Park) in Brooklyn Heights. However, this marginal railroad was never built.

In addition, the Bush Terminal Company ran a car float operation in which freight cars were loaded aboard car-float barges with railroad tracks, which traveled across New York Harbor to and from car float piers in New Jersey. The company had a fleet of tugboats specifically for car floats, each with three crews. Each tug pulled three or four car-float barges, which each measured 277 by 41 feet (84 by 12 m) and could hold up to 17 freight cars at a time. By 1957, two tugboats were still operating, which dated to 1905 and 1906.

=== Piers and storage ===
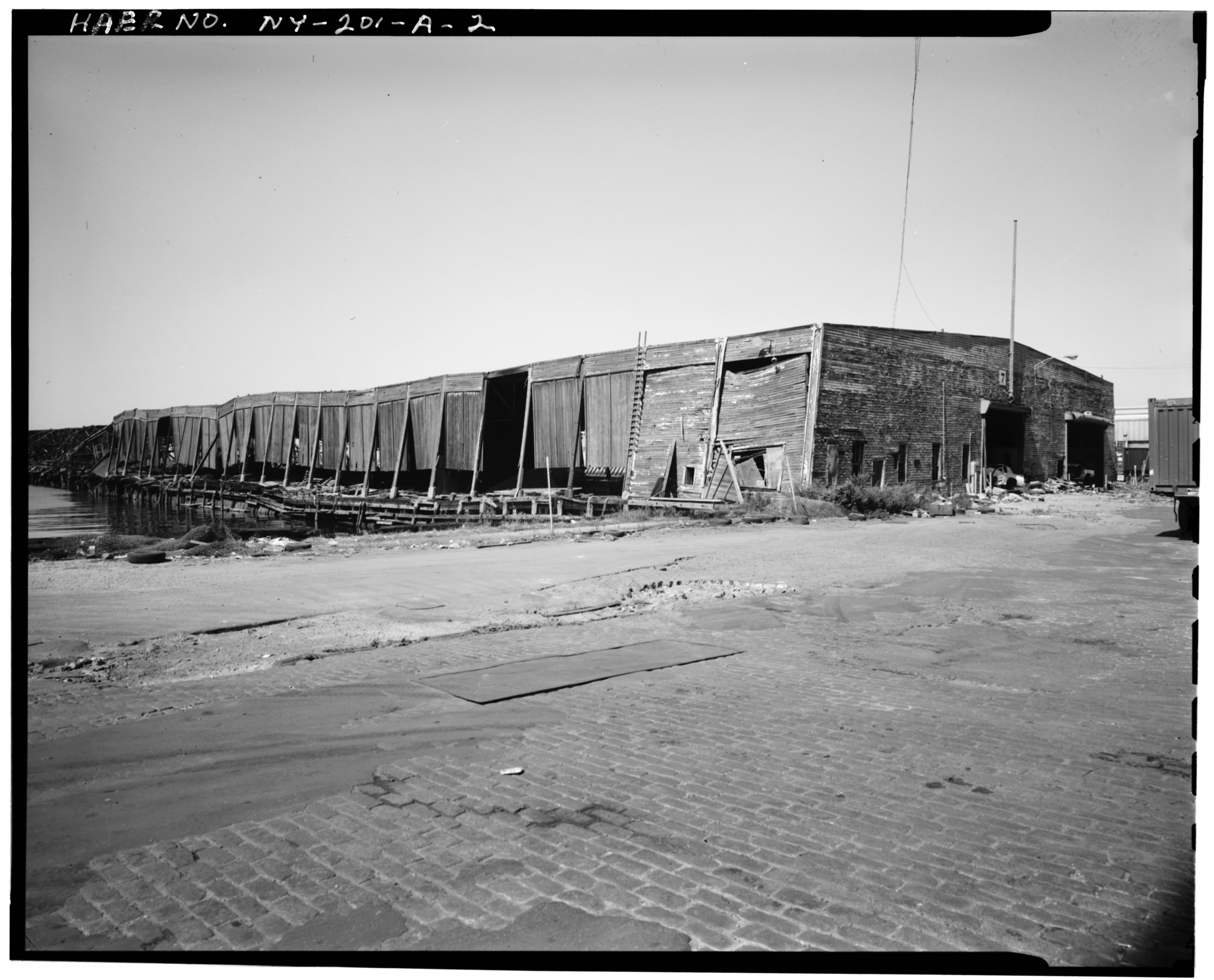
One of seven covered piers at Bush Terminal, seen in a dilapidated state some time after the mid-1980s

In its most active years, the Bush Terminal/Industry City complex contained seven covered piers, which each extended over 1,200 feet (370 m) into New York Harbor. Each pier measured 1,400 by 150 feet (427 by 46 m), and contained a railroad track for loading freight onto ships. Next to each pier were slips that measured 270 feet (82 m) wide by 40 feet (12 m) deep, large enough to accommodate container ships at the time. Twenty-five steamship lines used these piers, and by 1910, Bush Terminal handled 10 percent of all steamships arriving in New York.

Once freight was offloaded from vessels or ready for shipment, it could be stored within one of the warehouses at Bush Terminal. Estimates varied as to the number of warehouses at Bush Terminal. According to The New York Times, the complex had 118 warehouses by 1918, ranging in height from one to eight stories, which could store a combined 25,000,000 cubic feet (710,000 m^{3}) of goods. However, The Wall Street Journal described the terminal later that year as having 121 warehouses with 38,000,000 cubic feet (1,100,000 m^{3}) of total storage space, and a 1920 article in the Bush Company's magazine mentioned that the complex had 122 warehouses. The warehouses were used to store both raw and manufactured goods from Manhattan, in addition to materials offloaded from incoming ships and merchandise headed for distribution. The Bush Terminal Company also maintained a fleet of four steam lighters and seven tugboats that carried goods between the terminal and piers in Manhattan.

By 1920, distribution was controlled from an 8-story steel-and-concrete service building at 39th Street west of Second Avenue. The building had two levels of railroad tracks, one for incoming freight and one for outgoing freight, and each level could accommodate six freight cars.

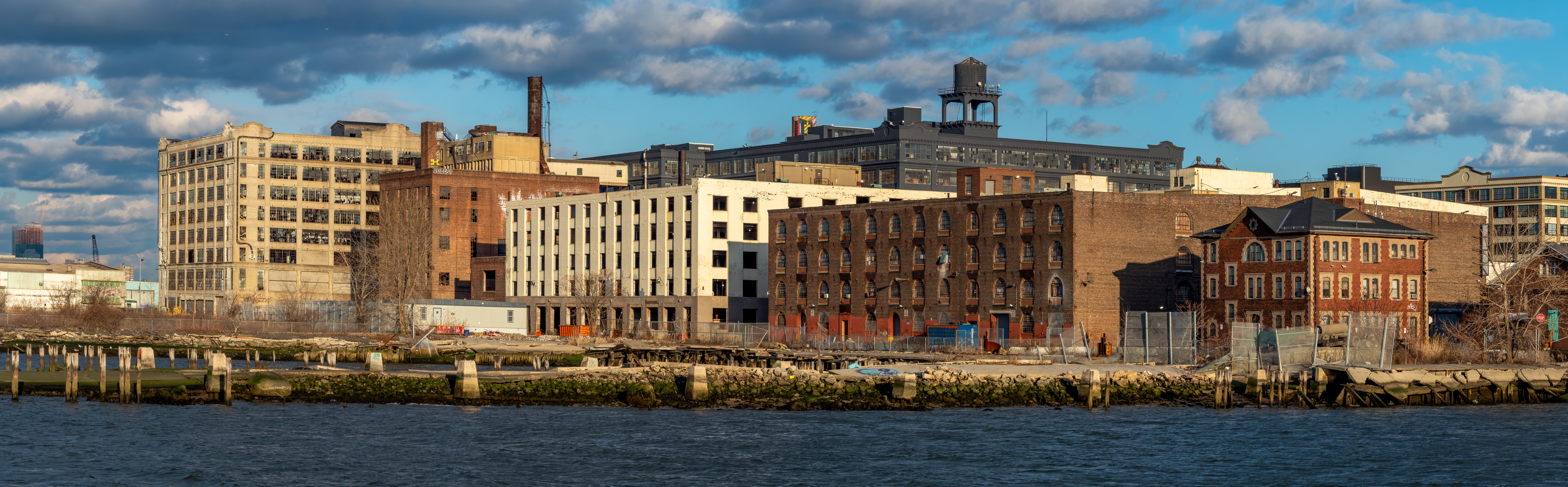
Warehouse section of the Bush Terminal complex between 39th and 44th Streets, and the remaining traces of the covered piers in 2021

=== Historic operations ===
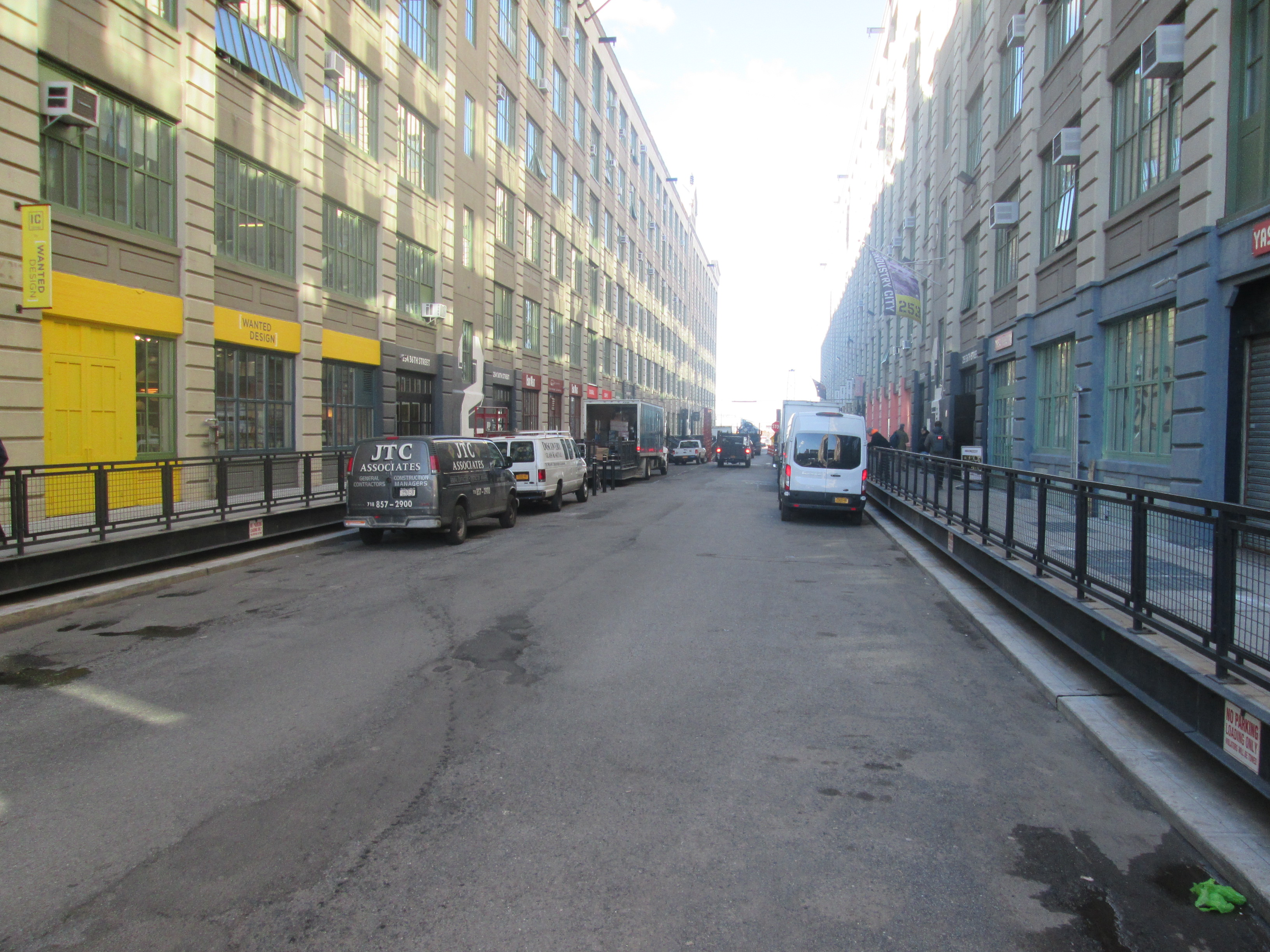
The sidewalks at Industry City double as loading docks.

When the complex was known as Bush Terminal, it offered economies of scale for its tenants, so that even the smallest interests could use facilities normally only available to large, well-capitalized firms. In 1940, tenants used 5,000 to 130,000 square feet (460 to 12,080 m^{2}) of space. During the 1910s, advertisements for Bush Terminal in newspapers such as the Brooklyn Daily Eagle offered tenants private railroad tracks, a "free waterfront," and "a million-dollar factory at your present rental or less"; they also claimed the complex covered over 200 acres (81 ha) of land. Other advertisements depicted companies moving to Bush Terminal in large numbers, "boosting" Brooklyn.

Bush Terminal employed 35,000 people by 1928. A private court system was created to mediate disputes. There were four tribunals; one each for marine employees, railroad workers, trucking employees, and mechanical employees. These handled civil cases, such as those for job demotions seen as unfair, and criminal cases, such as those for fraud. There was also a "supreme court" that handled disputes between departments, and employees were allowed to appeal cases directly to Irving Bush. The terminal also had a "Pivot Club", which was composed of longshoremen who met twice a week to draft legislation.

Bush Terminal had two coal-and-oil power plants for steam and light. An administration building was built sometime between 1895 and 1902. There was a hall for longshoremen, a bank, restaurants, and a trolley system to transport workers. There was a police force and fire department, as well as a mailbox for airmail. A chamber of commerce for Bush Terminal, created in June 1916, successfully advocated for improvements to the area, such as infrastructure and quality of life cleanup. Other amenities provided at Bush Terminal included social clubs, schools, and community centers.

== History ==
=== Concept and beginnings ===
Industry City was originally known as Bush Terminal, after founder Irving T. Bush. His family name came from Jan Bosch, who was born in the Netherlands and immigrated to New Amsterdam (now New York) in 1662; it is unrelated to the Bush political family.

In the 1880s, the future site of Bush Terminal was occupied by an oil refinery belonging to the Bush & Denslow company of Rufus T. Bush, Irving's father. Standard Oil bought this refinery in the 1880s and dismantled it, but after Rufus's death in 1890, Irving bought the land back using his father's inheritance. By 1890, there was a warehouse on the Bush Terminal site; the following year, the Bush Company completed a one-story office building at the intersection of First Avenue and 42nd Street. At the time, wholesalers in Manhattan faced expensive time, transportation, and labor costs when importing and then re-sending goods.

Irving Bush built six warehouses on the site between 1895 and 1897, but soon observed their inefficiency: "The ships were on one shore, the railroads on another, and the factories were scattered about the city on any old street without any relation to either kind of transportation. I thought: 'Why not bring them to one place, and tie the ship, the railroad, the warehouse, and the factory together with ties of railroad tracks?'" He organized six warehouses and one pier on the waterfront of South Brooklyn as a freight-handling terminal.

In its early days, the terminal was derided as "Bush's Folly". Bush Terminal differed from other New York rail-marine terminals by its distance from Manhattan, the size of its warehousing and manufacturing operations, and its fully integrated nature. Railroad officials would not ship directly to Brooklyn unless the customers first had orders of freight, as it required the extra cost of loading freight cars on car floats for the trip across New York Harbor to the ferry slips at the terminal. Railroad officials also feared that the harbor might freeze during the winter, making a car float unsustainable. Bush resorted to sending an agent to Michigan with instructions to buy 100 carloads of hay, then attempt to send the hay in its original railcars to Bush's terminal in Brooklyn. Railroad companies in the eastern U.S. declined their western agents' request to send the hay until the Baltimore and Ohio Railroad agreed to accept the offer and negotiate directly with the new terminal, after which other railways followed. To demonstrate that ocean vessels could dock at the piers, Bush leased ships and entered the banana business, and in doing so, made a profit. Likewise, to induce businesses to store goods at his terminal's warehouses, he warehoused coffee and cotton himself. Once Bush Terminal succeeded and expanded, sources credited Bush's "keen foresight" for undertaking such a "quixotic" business venture.

=== Expansion ===
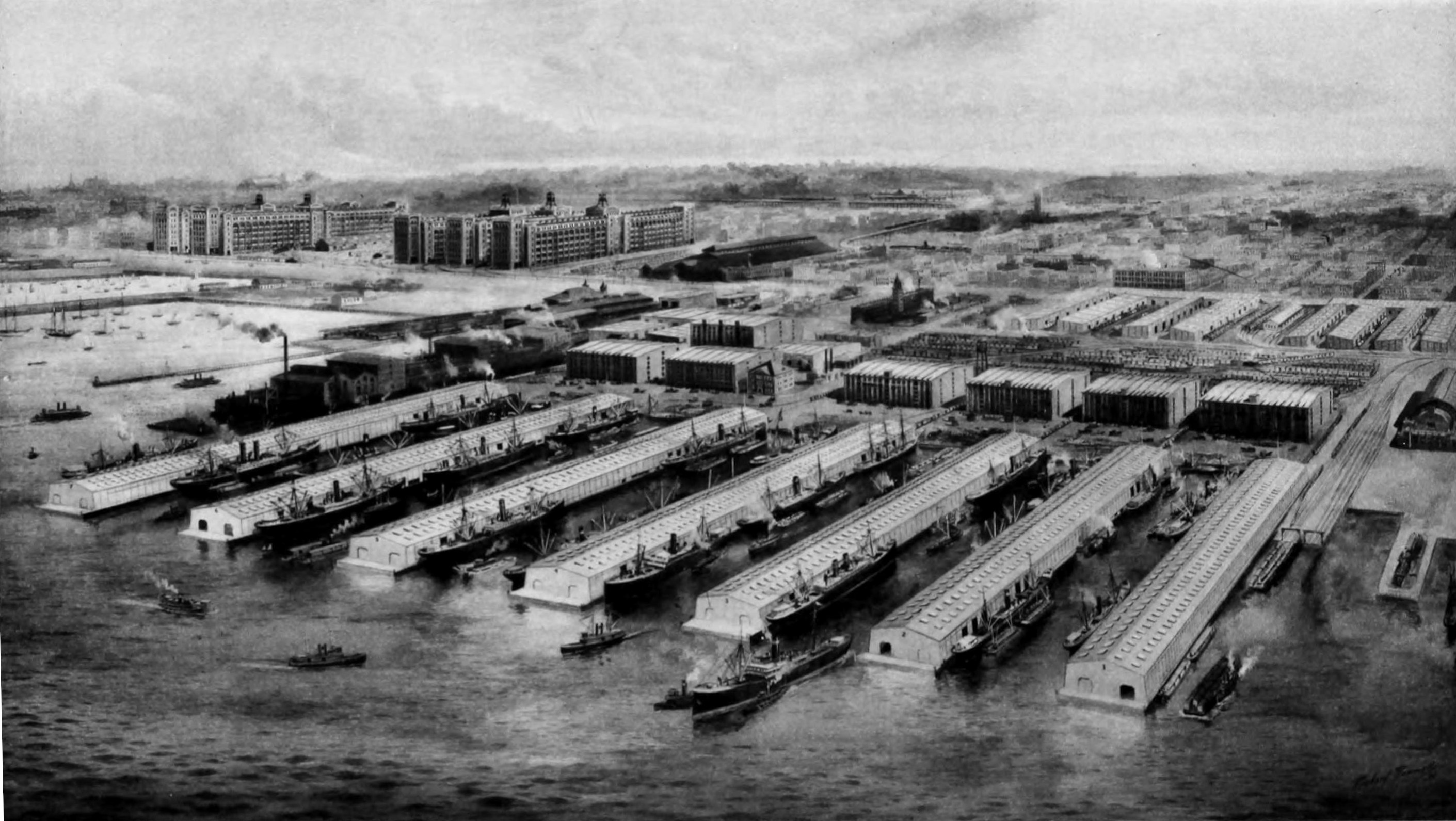
Bush Terminal, c. 1910

==== 1900s and 1910s ====
In 1901, the Bush Company operated properties at the western ends of 41st and 42nd Streets, facing the waterfront. That year, the company bought a plot of land from the Hunt family that stretched from 41st to 50th Streets. The following year, Bush Company terminal business became the Bush Terminal Company when Irving Bush bought the land from the Standard Oil Co. The same year, the Bush Terminal Company started grading land on the former Hunt estate. It planned to construct 18 factory loft buildings, 73 warehouses, and seven piers. The first pier opened in May 1903.

By 1905, five of the piers were complete, and the Bush Terminal Company owned ten of the twelve blocks of waterfront between 39th and 51st Streets, as well as the plot bounded by Second Avenue, Third Avenue, 37th Street, and 28th Street. A sixth pier was completed within two years. By this time, the shipping industry in Manhattan was becoming congested. By early 1909, three of the factory structures had been completed, and a fourth was under construction. Each building was six stories tall, measured 600 by 75 feet (183 by 23 m), and had 270,000 square feet (25,000 m^{2}) of floor area. The complex was convenient enough for industries that the first two buildings had been fully rented before they had even been completed. The Bush Terminal Company also arranged to lease a tenement structure at Third Avenue and 29th Street to house workers employed at Bush Terminal. It was expected that by the time fifteen to twenty of the factories were completed, Bush Terminal would employ 10,000 to 15,000 workers. Plans for a fifth and sixth factory building were announced in mid-1909, with the same dimensions as the existing factory structures. Early tenants included those in the printing and paper industries, and many of these tenants would remain through the 1950s.

In 1912, Irving Bush proposed that the city buy the Bush Terminal Company's piers, since the city had desired to purchase the company's waterfront land. Later that year, the New York City Board of Estimate received a proposal for the city to establish a freight terminal on the Brooklyn waterfront between 36th and 43rd Streets, and purchase that stretch of land from the Bush Terminal Company, as well as the Bush Terminal railroad and the entirety of Bush Terminal at the time. Under the plan, the existing Bush Terminal, the railroad, and the new city-owned terminal would continue to be operated by the Bush Terminal Company. That September, a special committee for the Board of Estimate approved the plan. However, the New York Merchants Association opposed the city's proposal to purchase Bush Terminal, because the Bush Terminal Company would then have a monopoly on the railroads along the Brooklyn waterfront. The city's commissioner of docks, Calvin Tomkins, also opposed the proposal because of concerns over a private monopoly, and because the Board of Estimate's special committee had ignored his original proposals.

By 1917, Bush Terminal had 26,500,000 cubic feet (750,000 m^{3}) of storage spread across 102 warehouses. The Bush Terminal Company had built 16 factory loft buildings with a combined floor area of 4,500,000 square feet (420,000 m^{2}).

==== Use by Navy during World War I ====
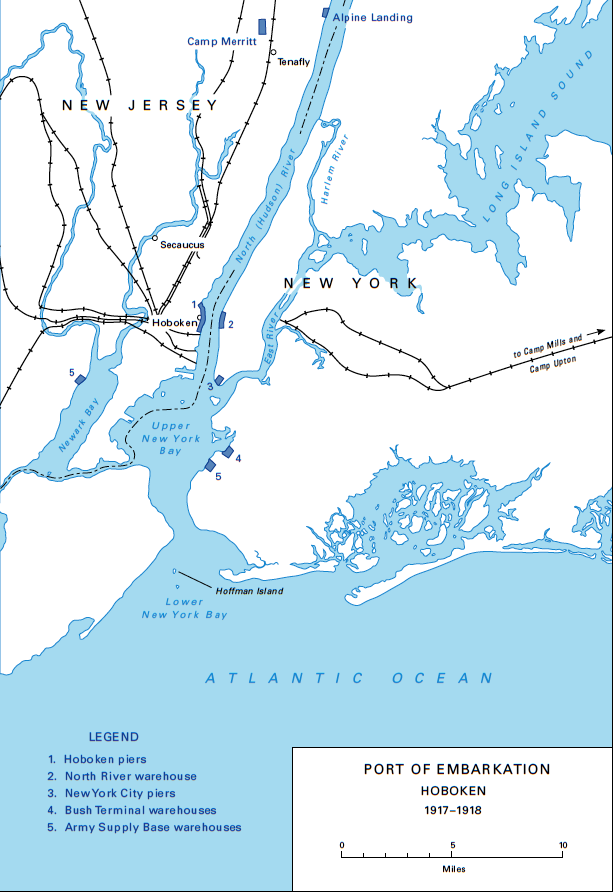
Bush Terminal relationship within the Army's Port of Embarkation Hoboken (1917–1918)

On December 31, 1917, the United States Navy announced that it would take over the piers and warehouses of the Bush Terminal Company. Major General George Goethals, acting Quartermaster General of the U.S. Army, praised Bush Terminal as being among the best shipping facilities in the United States. The Navy proposed to build 6,000,000 square feet (560,000 m^{2}) of storage space and four piers adjoining Bush Terminal. The United States Army also occupied warehouses within part of Bush Terminal, but it proposed to vacate that space so the Navy could use it. The U.S. Navy wanted to outright purchase Bush Terminal, and it was soon in negotiations with the Bush Terminal Company over the terminal's valuation.

In June 1918, Assistant Secretary of the Navy, and eventual President of the United States, Franklin D. Roosevelt wrote to Irving Bush to tell him that the navy would also be commandeering four of Bush Terminal's twelve manufacturing buildings. As a result, 64 manufacturers employing 4,500 people were ordered to vacate their spaces by the end of 1918. The eviction notice covered 276 total tenants in buildings 3, 4, 5, and 6. Although Bush reluctantly complied with the takeover, the Merchants' Association protested because the takeover would eliminate the jobs of a large workforce. Many companies at Bush Terminal also pushed back against the eviction order, citing the amenities at the terminal. The Bush Terminal Company recorded material losses the next year.

The U.S. Navy tied its rail lines into those of the Bush Terminal. Irving Bush helped to design Bush Terminal's southern neighbor, the Brooklyn Army Terminal, which was completed in 1919. Because of the railroad connection between Bush Terminal and the Brooklyn Army Terminal, and then to the mainland U.S. via the New York Connecting Railroad, the U.S. Navy wanted to operate the Bush Terminal for the duration of the war, paying a fee for the takeover. The piers of the terminal became part of the United States Army's New York Port of Embarkation. At the war's end the New York Port of Embarkation included eight piers in Brooklyn, including six Bush Terminal piers and two Army Supply Base piers; 120 Bush Terminal warehouses; twelve piers and seven warehouses in Hoboken, New Jersey; and three piers in the North River, Manhattan. A 1929 article in the Brooklyn Daily Eagle mentioned that during World War I, Bush Terminal handled about 70% of the ammunition, clothing, and food that went to American soldiers abroad.

The federal government quietly returned Bush Terminal to private ownership after the war. It paid out claims to the Bush Terminal Company for the use of the terminal space, though the last of the funds was not allocated until 1943, twenty-five years after takeover. In October 1919, the Bush Terminal Company announced the creation of a department for sporting-goods manufacturers at Bush Terminal. The company was designated with selling off excess cloth from the Army and Navy, which were considered war surplus.

=== Zenith ===
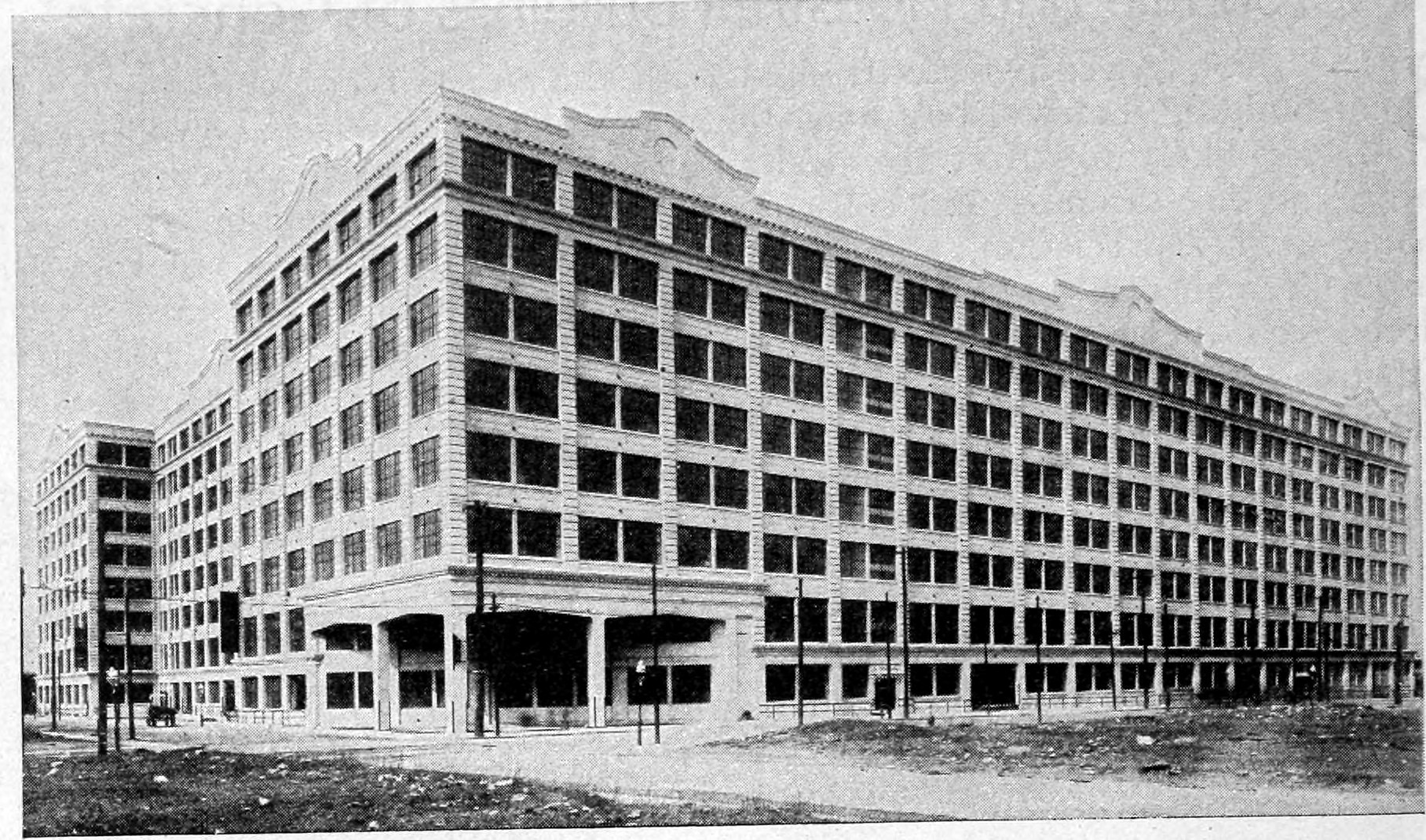
Bush Terminal Buildings 19 and 20, seen in 1920

==== 1920s ====
The twelve factory loft buildings that had been built by 1918 housed about 300 companies. By the end of World War I, Bush Terminal was an integral part of the economy of what is now Sunset Park. The terminal's fortunes rose with those of the borough of Brooklyn, which had over 2.5 million residents by 1930. Bush Terminal employed thousands directly and many thousands more worked for firms within Bush Terminal. By 1928, Bush Terminal had 35,000 workers, and it was so large that the terminal employed its own court system, as well as a police force and fire department.

World War I had halted expansion projects at Bush Terminal, and construction on these projects did not resume until 1926. In March 1927, the Bush Terminal Company completed 600,000 square feet (56,000 m^{2}) of new industrial space at Bush Terminal, bringing the amount of factory loft space to 5,600,000 square feet (520,000 m^{2}). By that time, the company was constructing two additional loft buildings, which would increase the factory loft space by 10%, as well as power plant at Bush Terminal. A branch of National City Bank (now Citibank) inside the terminal was opened the same year, as did a playground near the terminal.

==== Other Bush Terminal Company buildings ====
Early in the 20th century, the Bush Terminal Company commissioned architects Kirby, Petit & Green to design its headquarters building in Manhattan's Financial District at 100 Broad Street, near the intersection with Pearl and Bridge Streets. The relatively small yet notable five-story office building was located on the site of Manhattan's first church, built in 1633, and one book described the structure as having a "Gothic design with a strong flavor of Dutch."

The company also funded construction of Bush Tower, a 30-story skyscraper near Times Square in Manhattan, where tenants of Bush Terminal were offered display space to showcase their goods, above a club for buyers visiting New York. The Bush Terminal Company attempted a similar melding of commercial displays and social space at Bush House in London, built in three phases during the 1920s, but the concept was not fully carried through at that project.

==== Great Depression and World War II ====
Despite the onset of the Great Depression in 1929, the Bush Terminal Company was initially unaffected. In early 1930, Irving Bush created a new subsidiary, the Bush Services Corporation, which would allow small manufacturers in Bush Terminal to sell directly to manufacturers, thus eliminating the need for wholesalers as middlemen. Later that year, a direct seaplane route was established between Bush Terminal and Philadelphia. In 1931, in advance of a projected increase in business, the Bush Terminal Company planned to purchase $500,000 million worth of equipment, including eight electric train locomotives. To help potential tenants and customers find Bush Terminal more easily, wayfinding signs for the terminal were installed in the 36th Street subway station. A park at the site of an abandoned dumping ground was announced in 1934, and the Bush Terminal Company bought a fleet of new trucks for Bush Terminal the same year.

In mid-March 1933, seven members of the Bush Terminal Company's board suddenly quit, citing past mismanagement. The Bush Terminal Company went into receivership two weeks afterward, on April 1, 1933, due to an inability to repay its outstanding bonds. A new 11-person board of directors was appointed for the duration of receivership. The receivers started cutting costs, and by May, had eliminated $100,000 in expenses. In May 1935, the receivers removed Bush as the president of the Bush Terminal Company and subsidiaries. Shortly afterward, Bush unsuccessfully sued in Brooklyn federal court to have the receivers removed based on an accusation of incompetence. That November, stockholders filed a petition in Brooklyn federal court to reorganize the Bush Terminal Company, since the company was bankrupt. The reorganization was granted by Brooklyn federal judge Robert Alexander Inch. The company exited receivership on May 1, 1936. However, equity proceedings against the Bush Terminal Company were still pending, and in April 1937, the Bush Terminal Buildings Company filed for reorganization under a court order from Inch. Legal disputes between Bush and the trustees continued, including a libel suit filed by the trustees against Bush that later had to be re-litigated.

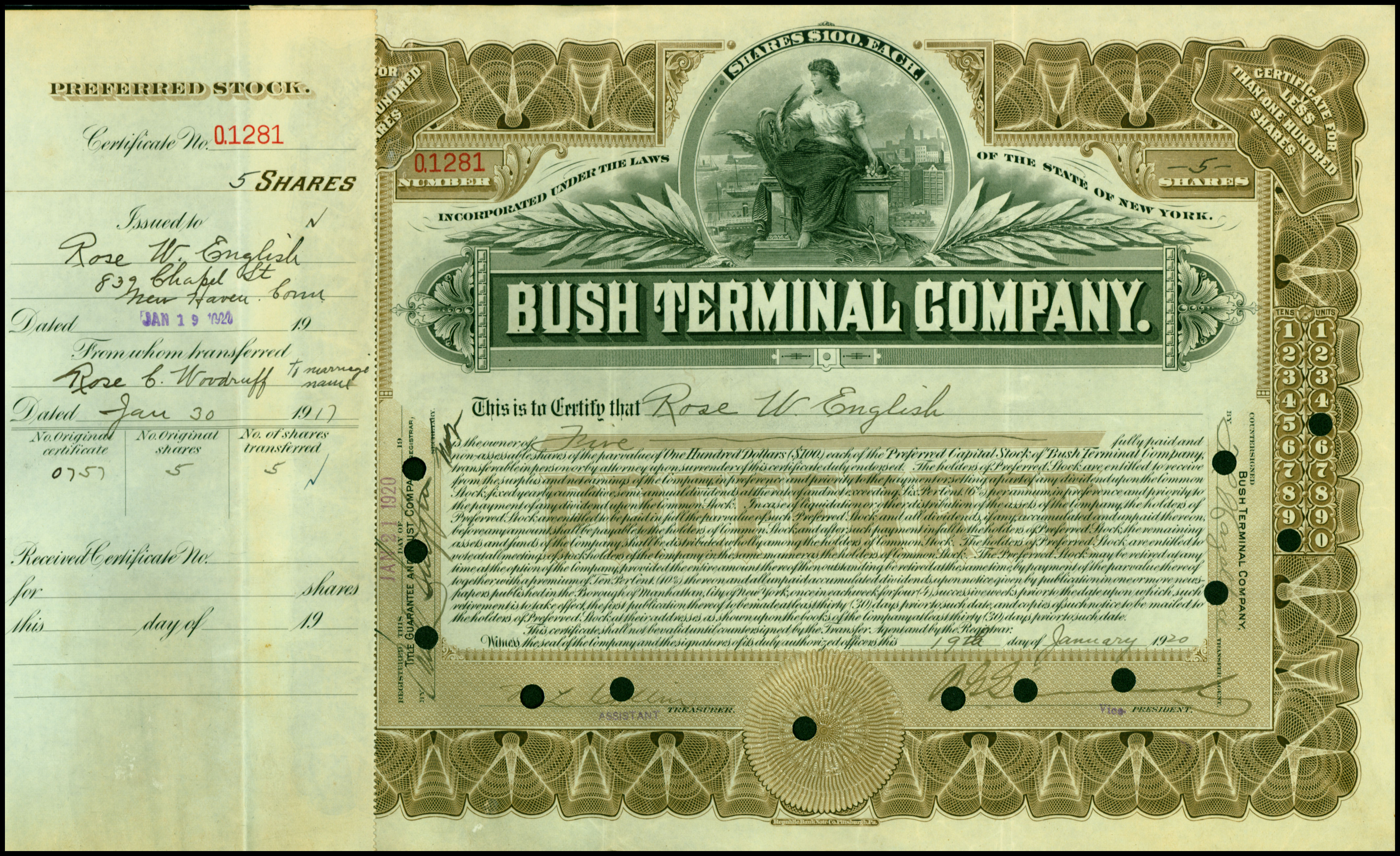
Preferred share of the Bush Terminal Company, issued January 19, 1920

Operations at the terminal itself continued relatively unaltered through the 1930s. However, vacancy rates reached as high as 35% during the Depression. The United States Postal Service decided to relocate the area's post office out of Bush Terminal in 1934 because the rent was too high. At some point, the Drug Enforcement Administration; the Bureau of Alcohol, Tobacco, Firearms and Explosives; the Internal Revenue Service, and the United States Coast Guard also occupied space in Bush Terminal.

In 1938, after lithographers signed leases for nine buildings in Bush Terminal, the Bush Terminal Company announced that the leased buildings would receive extensive renovations. The federal government, whose Works Progress Administration stored supplies such as clothing in warehouses at Bush Terminal, was another large tenant. Other large tenants included the Monarch Wine Company, which leased three buildings at Bush Terminal in 1939, and spice companies such as the Great Atlantic & Pacific Tea Company (now A&P), whose Bush Terminal tea-packing plant was once the world's largest. By 1941, ninety percent of the rentable space at Bush Terminal had been leased, and 69 of 70 one-story buildings had been rented.

During World War II, some buildings in Bush Terminal were again used by the federal government, which used 1,500,000 square feet (140,000 m^{2}) of storage space at the terminal. In mid-1941, the U.S. Army moved some civilian workers into more than 500,000 square feet (46,000 m^{2}) at Bush Terminal, spread across three buildings along First Avenue, because there was no more space at Brooklyn Army Terminal. Franklin D. Roosevelt's 1944 presidential campaign tour around New York City, which occurred in October 1944, started at the Brooklyn Army Terminal and Bush Terminal.

=== After World War II ===
Sunset Park began to suffer economic decline during the Great Depression, which worsened with the demolition of the Fifth Avenue Elevated. Bush Terminal and the Sunset Park waterfront were disconnected from the rest of the neighborhood by the 1941 construction and subsequent widening of the Gowanus Expressway (Interstate 278) above Third Avenue. After the war, "white flight", the maritime industry's move to New Jersey, and the 1966 deactivation of the Brooklyn Army Terminal also hurt the neighborhood until it was reopened as an industrial park in the 1980s. However, Bush Terminal still remained active around this time, although it was smaller compared to before World War II. The opening of the Brooklyn–Battery Tunnel in 1950 gave Bush Terminal and the surrounding area a direct link to Manhattan, which was seen as a benefit to the area's economy.

==== Late 1940s and early 1950s ====
In 1946, the administration of Mayor William O'Dwyer proposed building a food-produce market at Bush Terminal. The existing Brooklyn Terminal Market in Canarsie, Brooklyn, was too far away from convenient railroad connections, and the Bush Terminal market would compete with the Bronx Terminal Market in the Bronx, which was close to rail connections. However, the proposal to build a market at Bush Terminal was controversial among merchants because it would take profits away from the Brooklyn Terminal and Bronx Terminal Markets, as well as from the Washington Terminal Market in Manhattan, and it was ultimately not built.

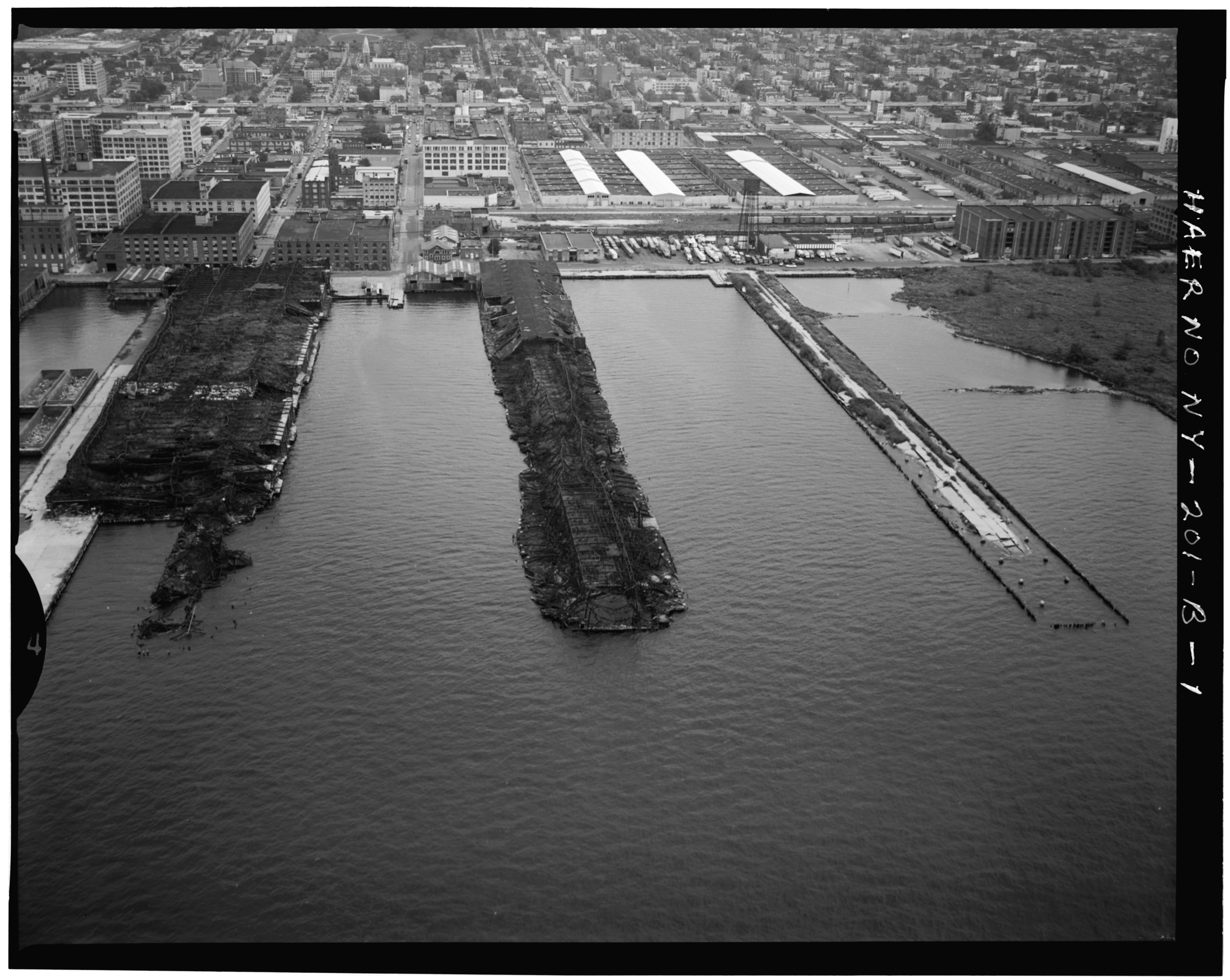
Aerial view of Pier 5

Irving T. Bush died in 1948. In his will, he stipulated that all Bush Terminal profits that went to him would go to a trust fund for one of his nieces. Bush was succeeded by A.P. Timmerman as chairman of Bush Terminal Company, and by J.L. Hanigan as president of the company. A statue to him was dedicated in 1950 at Bush Terminal's administration building. By that year, the Bush Terminal Company only employed about 700 people, though about 40,000 people either were directly supported by jobs at Bush Terminal or lived nearby. The company had 300 manufacturing tenants spread across 120 buildings.

In 1951, the Bush Terminal Company's real-estate, shipping, and industrial divisions were merged with the real-estate company Webb and Knapp, though the Bush Terminal Buildings Company remained separate. As part of the merger, $5 million in improvements was proposed for Bush Terminal, and the management of the Bush Terminal Company was allowed to continue operating as normal. It was around this time that the president of the Bush Terminal Buildings Company, R.A.P. Walker, started advertising the terminal's buildings in newspapers as "Industry City". The Industry City name was a reference to Bush Terminal becoming one of the first industrial parks in the United States following World War II.

After the Brooklyn-Battery Tunnel opened, the area around Industry City became so congested with traffic that, in 1953, the vice president of the Bush Terminal Merchants' and Manufacturers' Association proposed traffic improvements in the area. By Industry City's 50th anniversary in 1955, it employed 25,000 workers working for over 100 companies, and 25 tenants occupied 41% of the 6 million square feet at the complex. More than three-quarters of the tenants, 78%, had been at Bush Terminal for more than ten years, and 10% had occupied space there for more than 40 years. Major tenants included A&P, which roasted much of its coffee at industry City; Beech-Nut, which made candy and chewing gum; Virginia Dare, which made wine and flavoring extract; and two of the largest olive-oil producers in the U.S., according to The New York Times.

On December 3, 1956, Industry City was the site of what might have been the largest explosion in New York City history. Dockworkers were using an oxyacetylene torch to perform routine maintenance work when, at about 3:15 p.m. that day, sparks ignited 26,365 pounds (11,959 kg) of ground foam rubber scrap. Employees abandoned initial efforts to control the blaze; twenty-six minutes later, the fire reached 37,000 pounds (17,000 kg) of Cordeau Detonant Fuse, setting off an explosion. Earlier in the day, the burlap bags holding an additional 11,415 pounds (5,178 kg) of rubber scrap had broken, and investigators believed that pieces of the highly inflammable scrap had been strewn across the dock. The blast resulted in 10 deaths, including that of a man standing 1,000 feet (300 m) away; 274 injuries; and "major destruction" in a 1,000-foot (300 m) radius, including broken windows in buildings up to 1 mile (1.6 km) away. People reported hearing the explosion as far as 35 miles (56 km) away. However, none of the firefighters on land or water were injured because the shrapnel went over their heads. The follow-up report suggested several changes in policy to prevent similar future accidents, such as fire-risk training for all dock workers, and special markings for explosives. Damage from the explosion is still apparent at Industry City; iron on the fire escapes is mangled, and several windows contain embedded shrapnel.

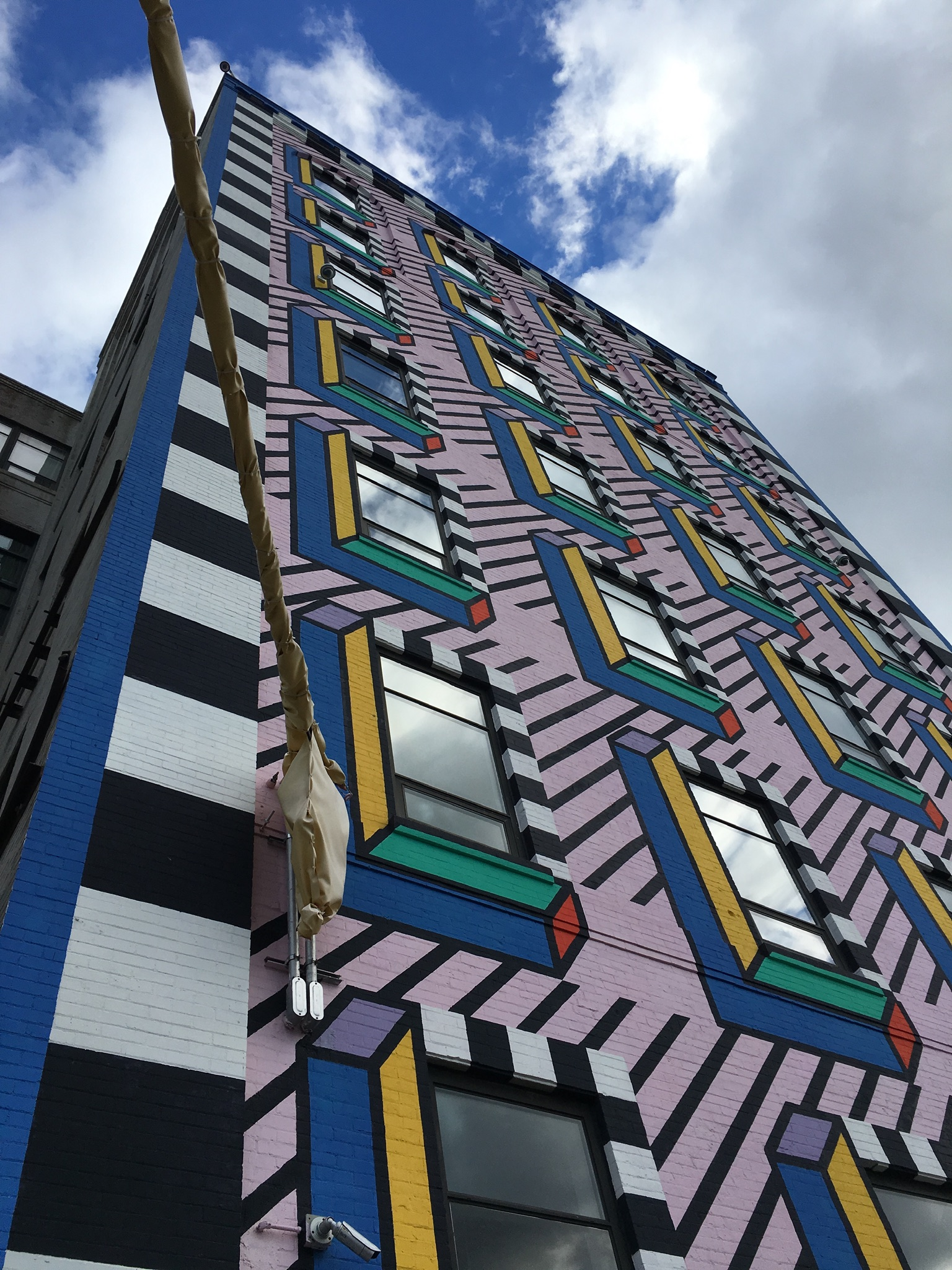
Mural at Industry City

From the early 1950s through the 1960s, the Topps company, which primarily made chewing gum and baseball cards, manufactured baseball cards at Industry City. Topps moved production to Pennsylvania in 1965, though its offices remained in Bush Terminal until 1994, when it moved to Manhattan. A major tenant—the Norton Lilly & Company, among the city's largest shipping companies—moved out of the terminal in 1957, having occupied Bush Terminal since 1902.

==== Late 1950s renovations and 1960s ====
In 1957, the city announced that a marine terminal for the Mitsui Steamship Company would be built near Industry City between 36th and 39th Streets. In conjunction with the construction of the Mitsui terminal, the pier at 35th Street, which had been wrecked in the Bush Terminal explosion the previous year, was rebuilt. The Mitsui terminal opened in 1960. As part of the modernization of Bush Terminal/Industry City, the Bush Terminal Company also renovated two railroad car float bridges in 1960 and 1963. The construction of a containership pier between 19th and 36th Streets, along the northern section of Industry City, was approved in 1967. This later became the South Brooklyn Marine Terminal.

Since its early years, the Bush Terminal Company had funded its Bush Terminal operations with investments in various companies. After Irving Bush's death, the company began buying larger interests in various companies. In 1961, the Bush Terminal Company had sold its 37% stake in the General Cigar Company, in which it had held stock for seven years, and used these funds to purchase stock in the Hamilton Watch Company and the New Jersey Zinc Company. The same year, the Bush Terminal Company sold its lower Manhattan headquarters building, which was soon demolished, and consolidated its offices at Industry City. A real estate group led by billionaire real estate figure Harry Helmsley bought Industry City in 1963. In turn, the Bush Terminal Company was acquired by Universal Consolidated Industries in 1968, and the combined company became the Bush Universal Corporation.

==== Decline of port ====
Shipping activity at Bush Terminal had gradually declined after World War II due to the introduction of containerized shipping and the construction of the Port Newark-Elizabeth Marine Terminal in New Jersey. In February 1969, the Bush Universal Corporation announced that pier operations between 39th and 52nd Streets would cease by the end of the year. That October, the company also applied to the Interstate Commerce Commission to discontinue the Bush Terminal Railroad due to a continuing decline in profits. In June 1970, the city government bought 100 acres (0.40 km^{2}) of land in Bush Terminal, between 39th and 50th Streets for $8.5 million, and leased the land to private companies. The city planned to make a containership facility at Bush Terminal, and so it was expected that this would create 500 to 1,000 jobs for longshoremen.

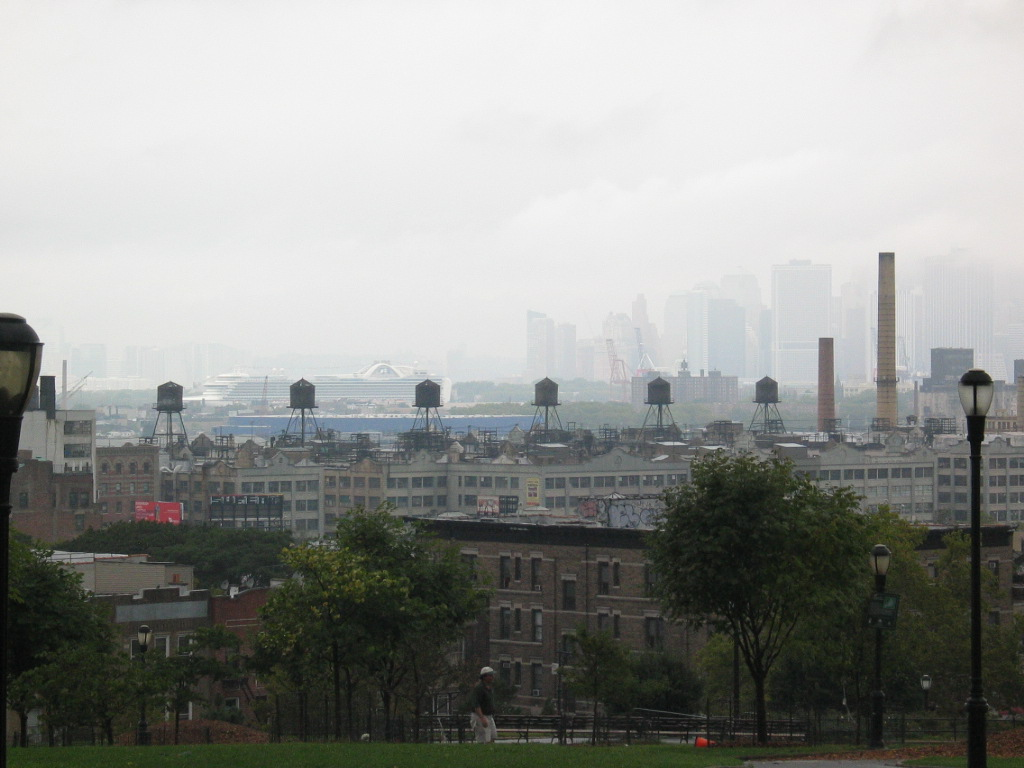
Distant view of some warehouses from Sunset Park

The Bush Terminal Railroad was officially abandoned in December 1971, despite protests from railroad workers. The last remaining tugboat in the car-float operation, the Irving T. Bush, was also retired at the same time. Car float and cargo transloading activities moved to the nearby 65th Street Yard and, along with the Bush Terminal Rail Yard, were taken over by New York New Jersey Rail, LLC, now owned by the Port Authority of New York and New Jersey (PANYNJ). The New York Dock Railroad was given a temporary permit to operate on the former Bush Terminal tracks until the city took title to the railroad in August 1973. New York Dock subsequently started leasing the tracks, and a direct track connection through the Brooklyn Army Terminal to the Bay Ridge Branch was established. Improvements to the tracks at and leading to Bush Terminal were announced in 1977, by which time the tracks had deteriorated. The tracks were later extended to the South Brooklyn Marine Terminal, adjacent to Industry City. They are now used occasionally to transport New York City Subway rolling stock via the South Brooklyn Railway. By 2016, the PANYNJ intended to reopen the adjacent 51st Street Yard.

In 1974, the City of New York Department of Ports and Terminals hired a private company to fill the spaces between Piers 1 through 4 to make space for parking shipping containers. Filling continued through the 1975 New York City fiscal crisis, and builders paid the city for the right to infill the piers. However, the filling operations were halted in 1978 after reports of environmental violations. New York City officials later learned that toxic wastes including oils, oil sludge, and waste water had been dumped at the site, making the four piers a polluted brownfield. In 2006, Mayor Michael Bloomberg and Governor George Pataki announced a $36 million plan to clean up and redevelop the Bush Terminal piers. The plan included a $17.8 million grant from the state of New York, the largest single grant the state had ever awarded to clean up a brownfield site.

As part of a reduction in military operations, in 1976 the federal government proposed moving its Navy resale systems office from Bush Terminal to Illinois. The office ultimately stayed at Bush Terminal after the rent was lowered.

=== Redevelopment ===
==== 1980s and 1990s ====
The privately operated portion of Industry City maintained 95 percent occupancy through the mid-1970s and was 98 percent occupied by 1980. By 1976, its tenants included 125 companies that employed 20,000 people, growing to 135 companies by 1980. However, there were also fewer tenants than in its peak years between World Wars I and II, partially because much of the space was being used for storage. These companies took up 89 percent of the 6 million square feet of factory loft space by 1985. The city-operated section of Bush Terminal employed 7,000 people by 1977, and the improvements to the tracks were slated to add 3,000 more jobs.

During the 1980s, Industry City housed the highest concentration of garment manufacturers in New York City outside of Manhattan. By 1985, thirty percent of the factory loft space at Industry City (1,800,000 square feet [170,000 m^{2}]) was rented by garment manufacturers, mainly because of high rents in Manhattan's Garment District as rents per square foot at Industry City were about half those in the Garment District. A new structure, the first to be built in the complex in several decades, was also under construction at Industry City, replacing another structure destroyed by fire. Industry City Associates bought the 35-acre (14 ha) complex from Helmsley's syndicate in March 1986. Shortly afterward, Industry City Associates filed plans to convert 650,000 square feet (60,000 m^{2}) of space in Industry City into industrial condominiums for small and medium-sized tenants. However, this conversion was never carried out.

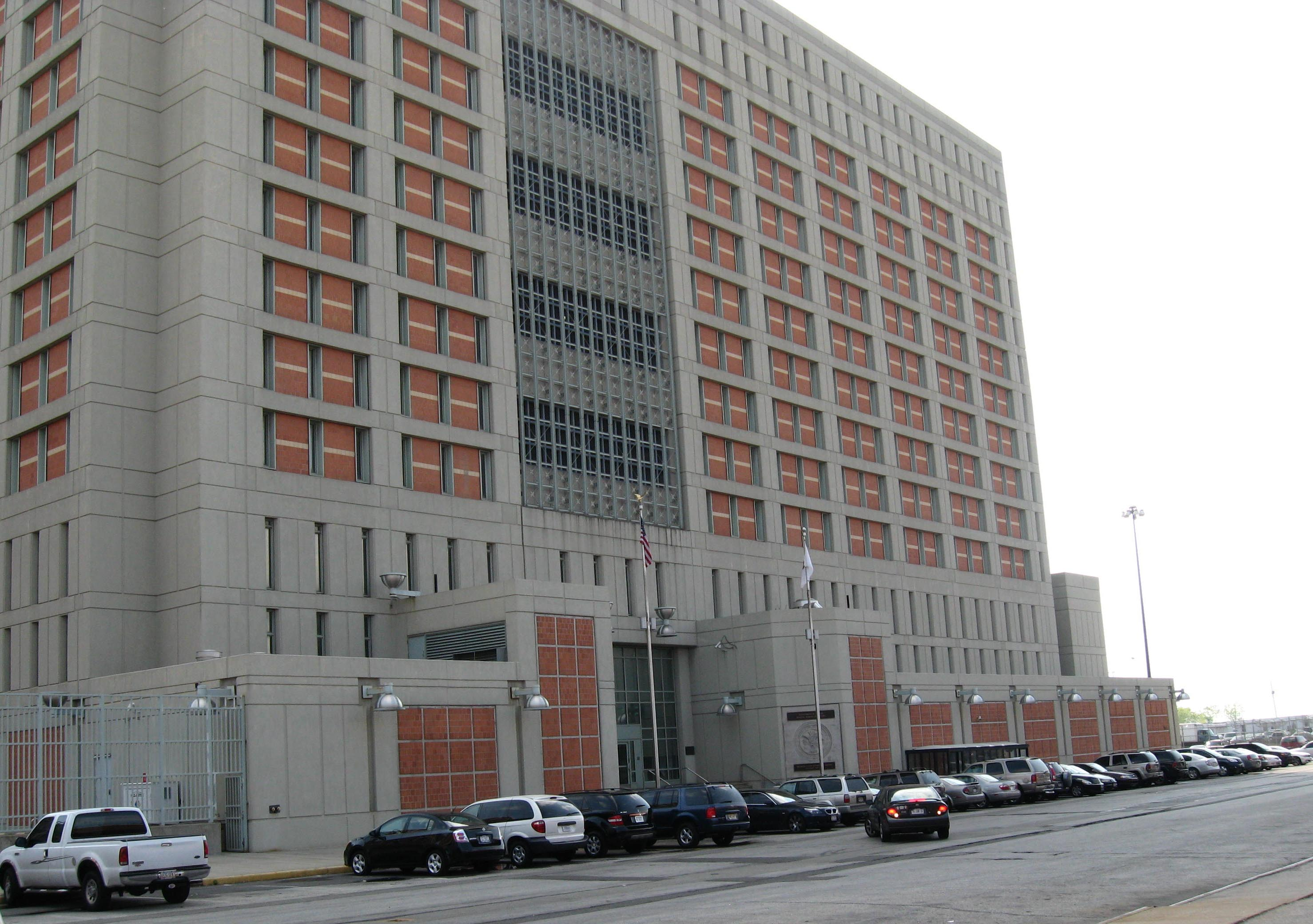
Metropolitan Detention Center, Brooklyn, which occupies the former site of a Bush Terminal building

The Federal Bureau of Prisons proposed converting two buildings at Industry City into a federal jail in 1988, due to overcrowding at the Manhattan Detention Complex. There was large opposition from members of the local community, who feared that traffic congestion in the area would rise. The prison, now Metropolitan Detention Center, Brooklyn, was approved in 1993 in spite of the community's objections. To make room for MDC Brooklyn, Federal Building No. 1 was destroyed in a controlled explosion in August 1993.

In 1991, the New York City government proposed placing a sludge disposal plant at Bush Terminal. The $225 million plant would have been located on the west side of First Avenue between 47th and 51st Streets. It would have been one of five total sludge plants placed in each of the city's boroughs. The plan was withdrawn in 1993 due to large opposition from the surrounding community, which brought up issues about the pollution and loss of jobs that would be caused by the sludge plant.

==== NYCEDC's Bush Terminal redevelopment ====
By the 1980s, the section of Bush Terminal between 41st and 50th Streets was derelict with large populations of squatters and prostitutes, and it was reportedly used for dumping dead bodies. The city allowed the Southwest Brooklyn Industrial Development Corporation (SBIDC) to develop 1,500,000 square feet (140,000 m^{2}) of space, spread across eleven warehouses, in this part of Bush Terminal in 1989. The New York City Economic Development Corporation (NYCEDC) started leasing three of the city-owned buildings at Bush Terminal in the 1990s. The SBIDC, in conjunction with the NYCEDC, cleaned up and renovated the Bush Terminal structures. By 1998, the eleven warehouses were at 100% occupancy and they collectively housed 150 tenants. In 1997, the city also provided some funding to repurpose parts of one building in Bush Terminal as a business incubator for the garment industry.

In 2006, the NYCEDC proposed selling to developers the three warehouse buildings that it leased. Following the 2009 rezoning of Sunset Park, the NYCEDC started soliciting requests for proposals to redevelop the three buildings with a collective area of 130,000 square feet (12,000 m^{2}). The requests for proposals were re-issued in 2011 to allow for a longer lease.

In 2017, the architecture firm WXY announced a $136 million renovation of the Bush Terminal plot between 41st and 51st Streets. WXY's master plan for the site, which would be renamed the "Made in NY" campus, would be carried out in conjunction with other firms. The Made in NY campus would include a 100,000-square-foot (9,300 m^{2}) studio complex for film and TV, as well as a 200,000-square-foot (19,000 m^{2}) area within two existing buildings, which would be refurbished into a hub for fashion manufacturing. The renovations would include a public plaza outdoors, as well as an entrance to the nearby Bush Terminal Piers Park. The proposed Made in NY campus was controversial, since it would displace existing small garment manufacturers. The NYCEDC started soliciting proposals for tenants at the Made in NY campus in August 2018. In 2020, Steiner Studios signed a deal to build a new studio at the city-owned portion of Bush Terminal, where it would erect a studio of 525,000 square feet (48,800 m^{2}). Due to the COVID-19 pandemic in New York City, the project's completion was delayed from 2020 to 2022. The first part of the Made Bush Terminal campus opened in late 2024, having cost $148 million. At the time, the rest of the campus was planned to be finished in 2027. Officials began constructing Pier 6, a 5-acre (2.0 ha) public park at Bush Terminal, in 2025.

==== Industry City redevelopment ====
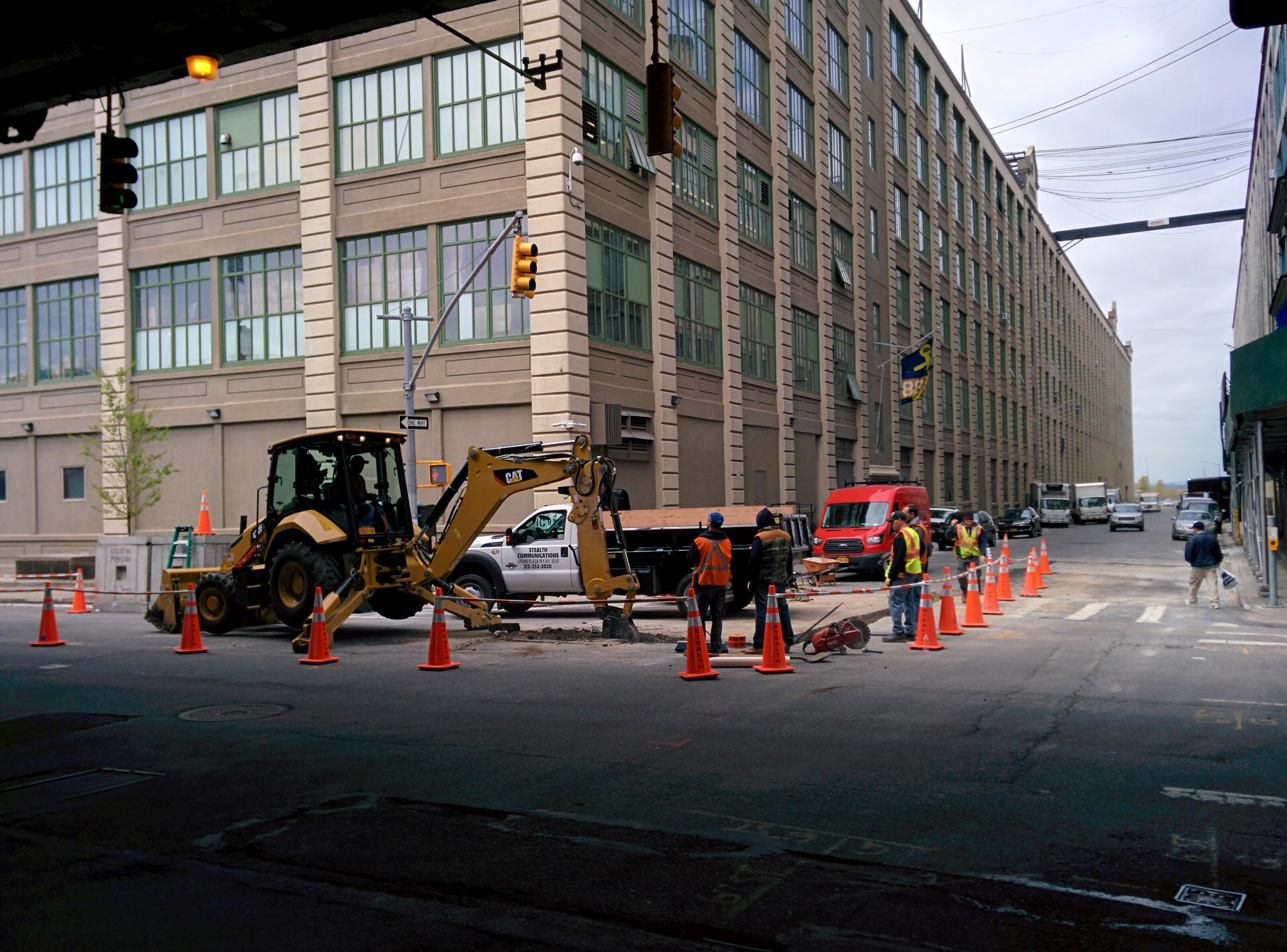
Stealth Communications constructing new underground Gigabit fiber system at Industry City in 2016

In 2000, during the dot-com boom, the New York City government planned to turn part of Industry City into a technology campus as part of its Digital NYC program, in conjunction with SBIDC and Industry City Associates. The project called for installing high-speed optical fiber cables at Industry City, which would be funded by a $250,000 grant to SBIDC. Upon the completion of the project, Industry City would be integrated into the then-new Sunset Park Technology District. As part of the project, two buildings at Industry City would be dedicated specifically to housing electronic machinery, and backup generators would be installed in the spaces between buildings. A third building, the Brooklyn Information Technology Center (BITC), was opened for use by technology companies in September 2000.

Industry City began attracting artists in 2009 by building 30,000 sq ft (2,800 m^{2}) of artists' studios and conducting creative events such as film screenings and art installations, such as the Marion Spore project. Industry City hosted Brooklyn's Fashion Weekend, a biannual exposition showcasing the work of local and international fashion designers, in 2013.

By 2012, Industry City was only 66% occupied and its tenants employed 2,500 workers. A consortium composed of Belvedere Capital Real Estate Partners, Jamestown Properties, and Angelo, Gordon & Co. purchased Industry City in 2013. The new owners intended to renovate the complex into a manufacturing and office hub. The Industry City ownership consortium also pushed to lease the vacant space at Industry City. In 2014, the NBA's Brooklyn Nets announced their intention to move their training center to Industry City. The new facility, the Hospital for Special Surgery Training Center (HSS Center), was to be built on the roof of Building 19 of the complex, at the time an empty warehouse, occupying 70,000 square feet (6,500 m^{2}) of space in total. The renovation project was estimated to cost roughly $50 million. The center opened in February 2016. A job training center for Sunset Park residents, called the Innovation Lab, opened at Industry City that April. By December 2016, the tenants at Industry City had a combined 6,000 employees.

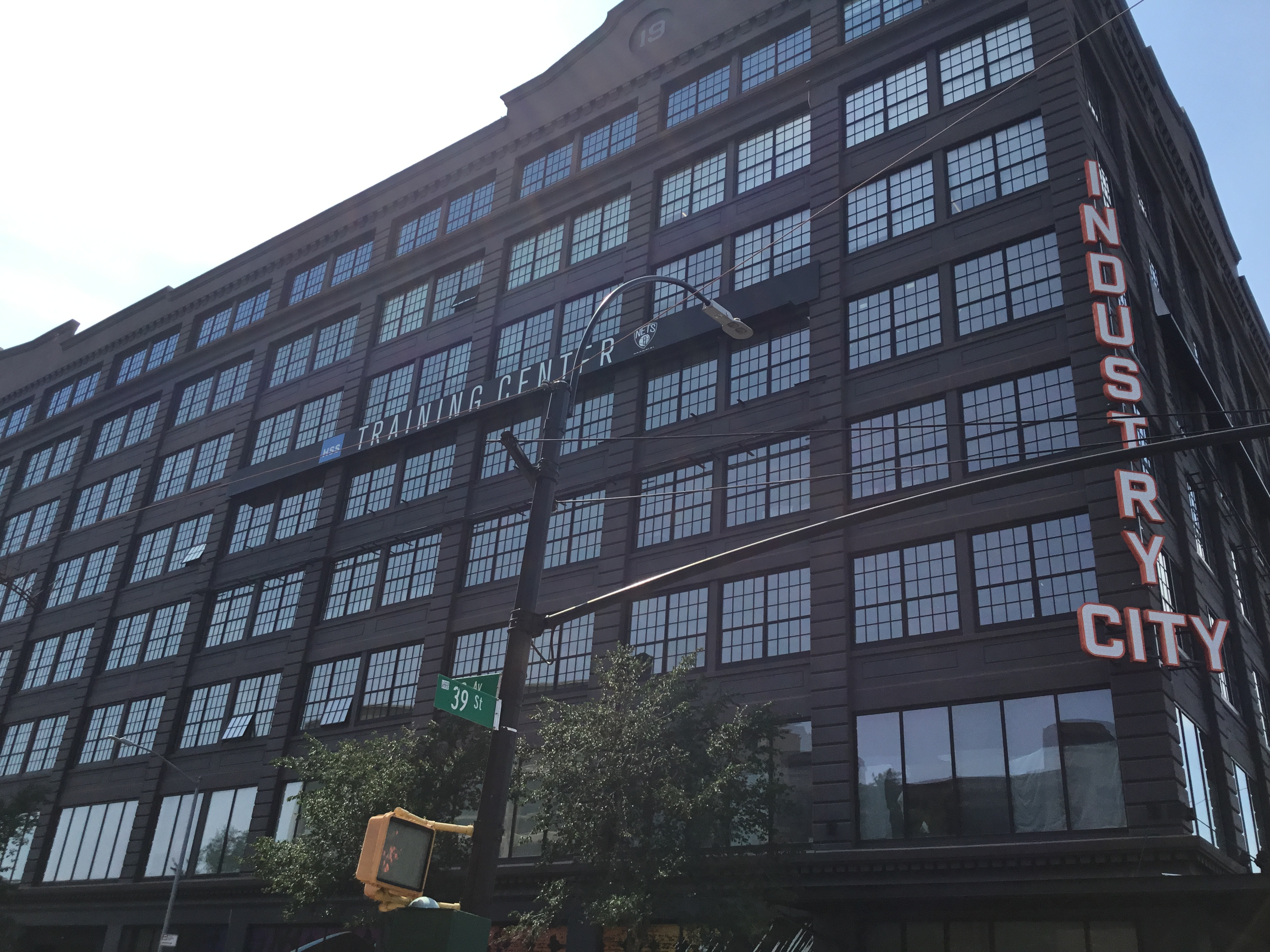
Building 19, used as the HSS Training Center by the Brooklyn Nets

Industry City's owners announced a $1 billion renovation plan in March 2015. The plan originally involved adding dormitories for college students, but the dormitories were canceled in 2016 after public opposition. A 500,000-square-foot (46,000 m^{2}) area in Building 19 was also to be renovated into a space for technology tenants. As part of the renovation plans, the Industry City ownership consortium proposed an expansion plan in October 2017, which would rezone the campus and add 3,300,000 square feet (310,000 m^{2}) of commercial space to Industry City. UPROSE and other organizations worried that expansion might accelerate the gentrification of Sunset Park. In March 2019, Industry City postponed its rezoning application because politicians objected that the community had not been given sufficient time to provide input. The project was canceled in September 2020 because of opposition from city council member Carlos Menchaca and local community groups.

A Japanese-themed food court was announced for Industry City in October 2017; it opened in November 2018. The New York City government also proposed adding a film studio in Industry City in August 2018. During the early 2020s, Industry City gained additional tenants including New York University's Martin Scorsese Virtual Production Center, a 100-seat theater, and several design firms. In addition, the complex began hosting Brooklyn Night Market events. An indoor climbing gym opened at the complex in 2024.

== Legacy ==
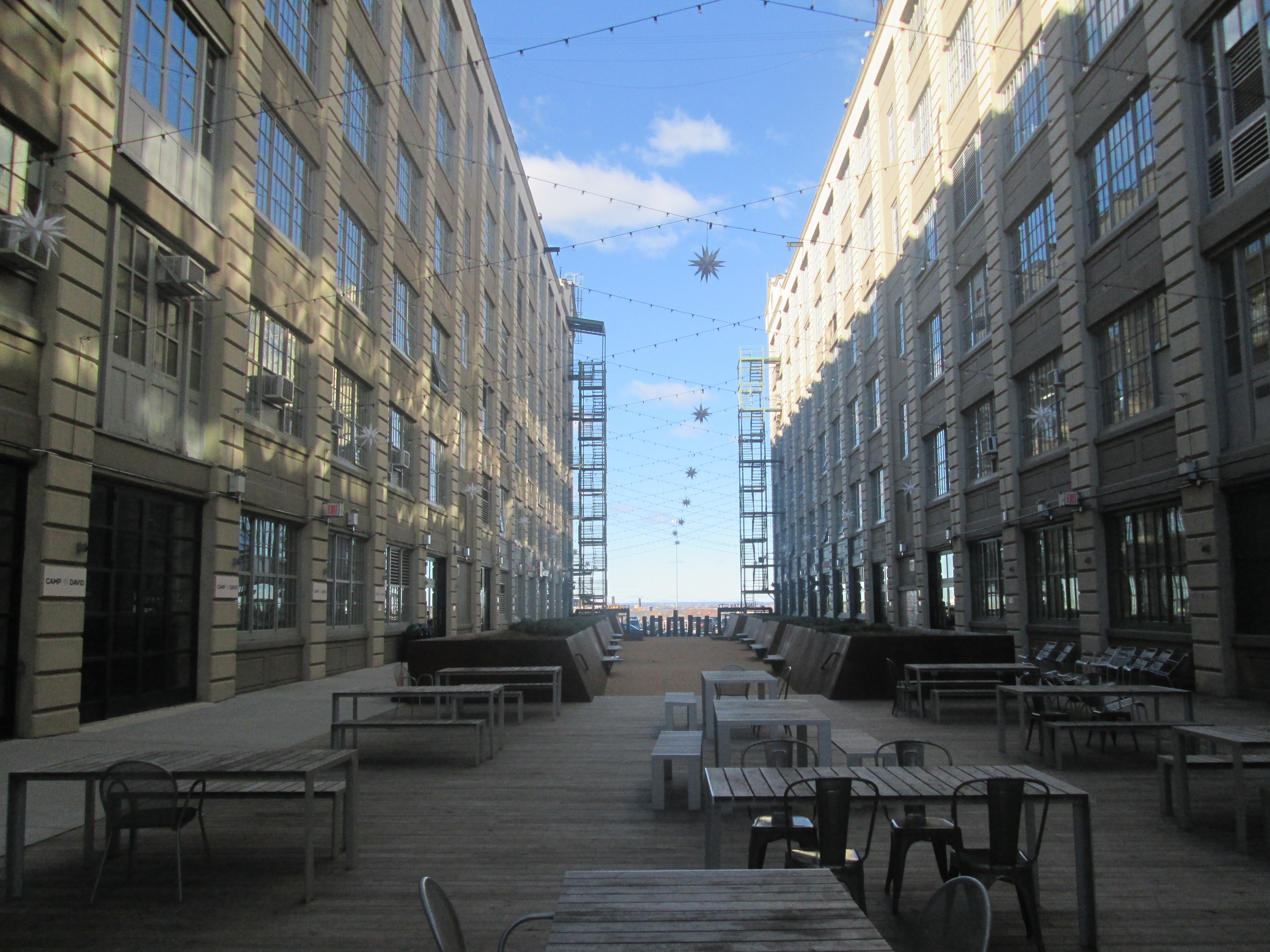
Recess between two loft buildings, repurposed into an outdoor plaza

Bush Terminal was one of the first and largest integrated cargo and manufacturing sites in the world. It employed tens of thousands of workers. It was a model for other industrial parks. It funded the Bush Tower in Manhattan and Bush House in London. It influenced the design of the Brooklyn Army Terminal. It affected the growth of Brooklyn and New York City.

=== Bush Terminal Piers Park ===
Bush Terminal Piers Park is a 24-acre (9.7 ha) green space between 43rd and 50th Streets that contains a pedestrian and bike path as well as baseball and soccer fields, tidal ponds, a wooded area, and access to a pier. The planning and design process for the park, encompassing piers 1 through 5, began in 2001, and construction on the park began in 2012. Bush Terminal Piers Park opened in November 2014 with one entrance at 43rd Street. A second entrance to the park at 50th Street started construction in November 2016 and opened in July 2017.

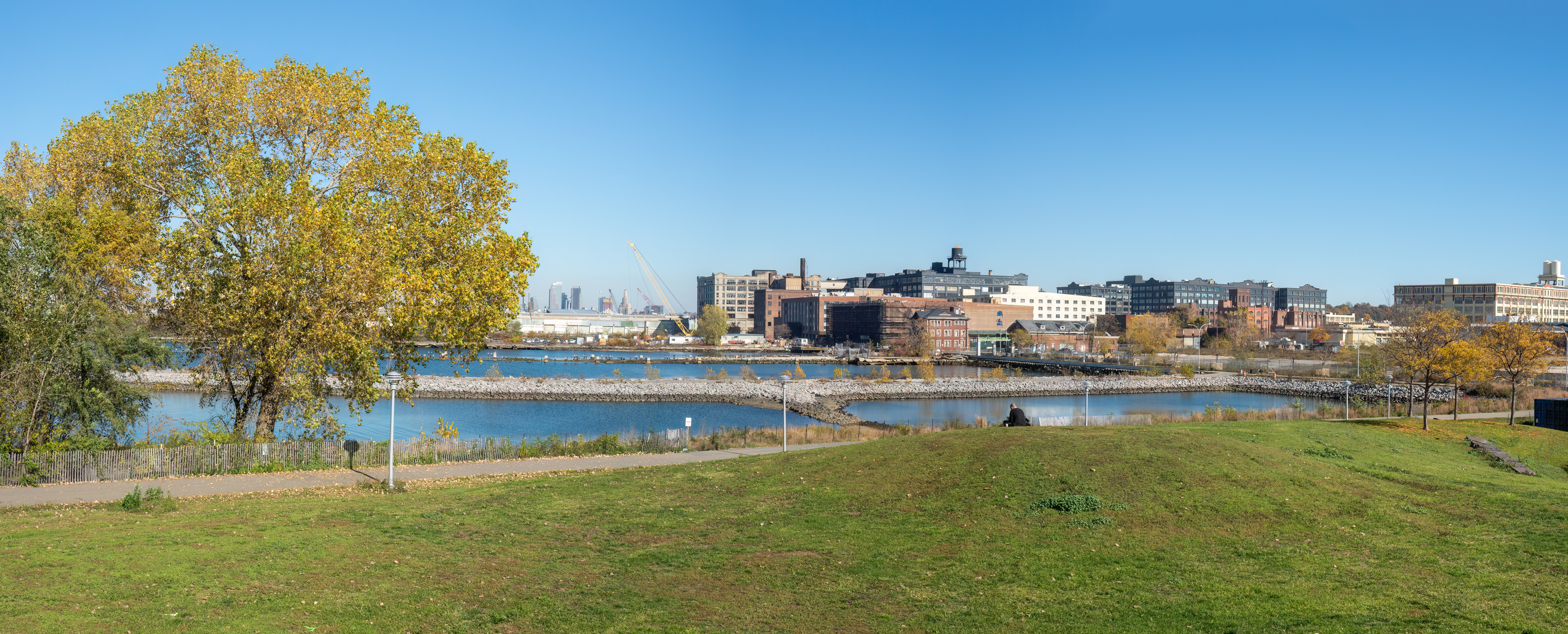
Bush Terminal Piers Park

Bush Terminal Piers Park is part of the Brooklyn Waterfront Greenway, a 14-mile (23 km) off-street path. The greenway is planned to connect neighborhoods along Brooklyn's waterfront, running through the Industry City complex to Owls Head Park in Bay Ridge, which is also served by the Sunset Park Greenway.

== Transportation ==
MTA Regional Bus Operations' B35 and B70 routes terminate near Industry City, while the B37 route stops along Third Avenue, close to the complex. The closest New York City Subway station to Industry City is at 36th Street and Fourth Avenue, served by the D, N, and R trains. The 45th Street subway station, served by the R train, is closest to the NYCEDC section of Bush Terminal.

Formerly, a Staten Island Ferry route ran from a ferry slip at 39th Street within Bush Terminal, now the site of the South Brooklyn Marine Terminal, to the St. George Terminal in Staten Island. The ferry route was discontinued in 1946 after a fire at St. George Terminal. In January 2020, the New York City Economic Development Corporation announced that NYC Ferry would construct a new stop at 42nd Street near Industry City/Bush Terminal, which would open in 2021. The South Brooklyn route, which at the time ran between Pier 11/Wall Street in Manhattan and Bay Ridge in Brooklyn, would have its Brooklyn terminus truncated to Industry City/Bush Terminal if that stop was added. More recent NYC Ferry expansion plans from 2022 do not mention a Bush Terminal ferry stop.

== See also ==
- Rail freight transportation in New York City and Long Island
- Emergent City a 2024 documentary film about the redevelopment of Industry City
