= MPI MP8AC-3 =

Lightweight diesel-electric locomotive

MPI MP8AC-3 R156 (New York City Subway)
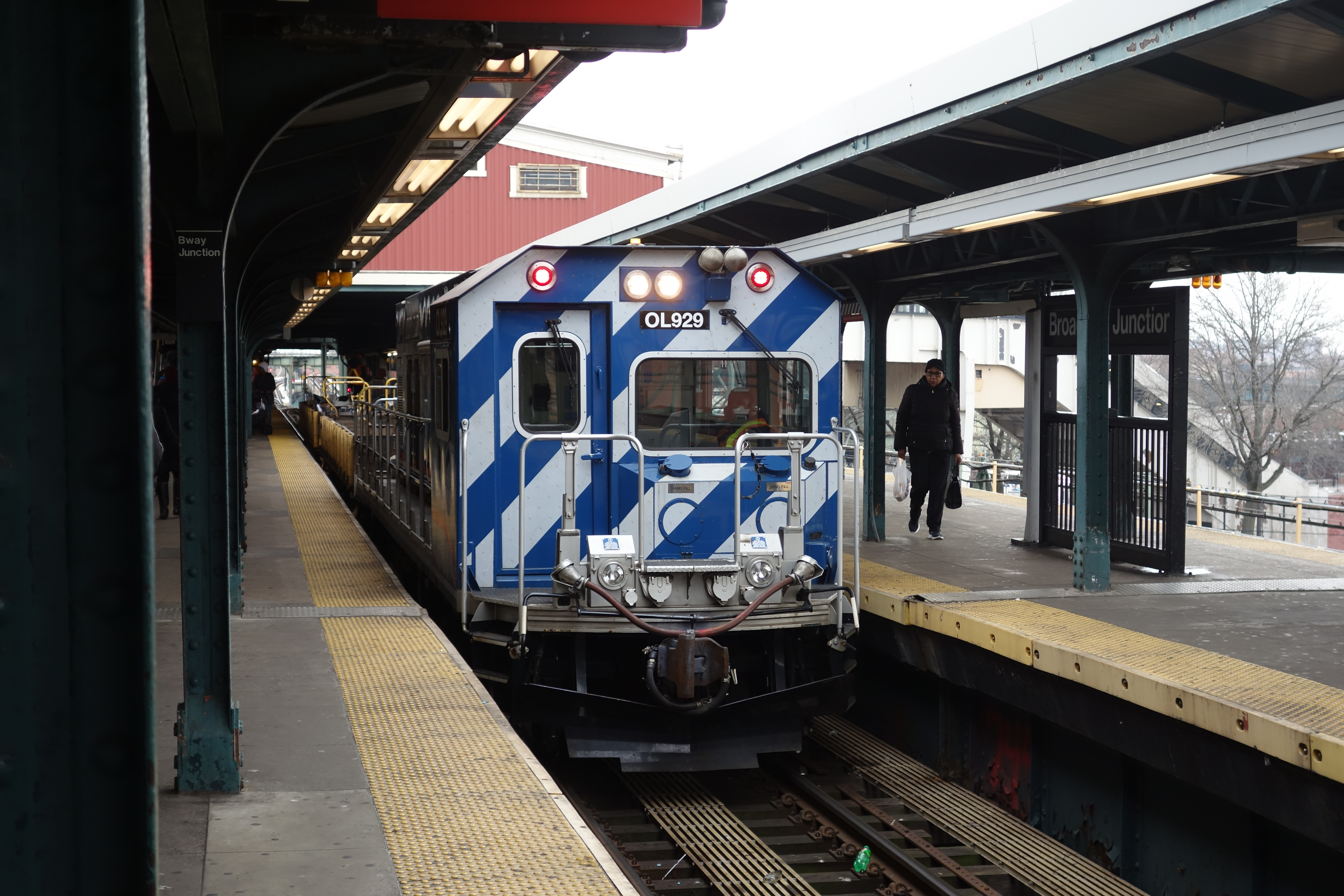
- An R156 locomotive on the BMT Jamaica Line at Broadway Junction station
Type and origin
- Power type: Diesel-electric
- Builder: MotivePower
- Order number: OL912–OL939
- Build date: 2012–2013
- Total produced: 28
Specifications
- Configuration
  - AAR: B-B
  - UIC: Bo'Bo'
  - Commonwealth: Bo-Bo
- Gauge: 4 ft 8 1/2 in (1,435 mm)
- Trucks: Kawasaki R156 Fabricated Frame
- Wheelbase: 36 ft 0 in (10.97 m)
- Length: 53 ft 3.25 in (16.2370 m)
- Width: 8 ft 8.25 in (2.6480 m)
- Height: 11 ft 5.375 in (3.48933 m)
- Axle load: 29,000 lb (13.2 t)
- Adhesive weight: 100%
- Loco weight: 116,000 lb (52.6 t)
- Fuel type: Diesel fuel
- Fuel capacity: 500 US gal (1,900 L; 420 imp gal)
- Prime mover: Cummins QSK 23G
- RPM range: 600-2100
- Engine type: Inline-6 Cylinder, four stroke cycle diesel engine
- Generator: Hitzinger SGS7
- Traction motors: Siemens SITRAC AC propulsion 221 hp (165 kW) per axle
- Cylinders: 6
- Cylinder size: 3.8583 L (1.0193 US gal; 0.8487 imp gal)
- Transmission: AC-DC-AC
- Train heating: John Deere 5030HF285, 3.0L, 96 hp (72 kW)
- Loco brake: Electro-pneumatic
- Train brakes: Pneumatic
Performance figures
- Maximum speed: 30 mph (48 km/h)
- Power output: Gross: 860 hp (641 kW); Traction: ~300 hp (224 kW) @ 15 mph (24 km/h)
- Tractive effort: 20,250 lbf (90.1 kN) Starting; 15,000 lbf (67 kN) @ 7 mph (11 km/h); 7,500 lbf (33 kN) @ 15 mph (24 km/h); 4,200 lbf (19 kN) @ 25 mph (40 km/h)
Career
- Operators: New York City Subway
- Class: R156
- Number in class: 28
- Delivered: 2012–2013
- First run: May 1, 2012

The MPI MP8AC-3, classified by the New York City Subway as R156, is a lightweight diesel-electric locomotive built by the MotivePower division of Wabtec. It was designed from scratch as a work train engine, and formed the basis of the later R255 locomotive.

== Description ==
The R156 is designed to navigate the clearances and tight turns of the NYC Subway, with weight constrained to 112,000 pounds (51,000 kg), so it can operate on elevated portions of the system. It joins a fleet of 62 diesel-electric work locomotives on the system. Third rail power is not used because the third rail is normally turned off at work sites for safety reasons. Instead, the R156 is powered by a 6-cylinder, 800 horsepower Cummins QSK 23 diesel engine. A separate, smaller John Deere Diesel drives a generator to provide auxiliary power and to heat the main engine and keep batteries charged when the main engine is not running. Trucks are supplied by Kawasaki, which provides the same wheel and traction sets for the R160 subway cars. The traction motors are Siemens' SITRAC AC motors (the same ones on R160Bs 8843–9102). The R156 locomotives have provisions for the future installation of communications-based train control (CBTC) equipment, which were expected to be installed by June 2017.

The MTA ordered 28 units in 2006. After some difficulty with the initial prototype, the first unit, numbered OL912, was delivered on May 1, 2012.
