= Hell Gate Bridge =

Bridge in New York City

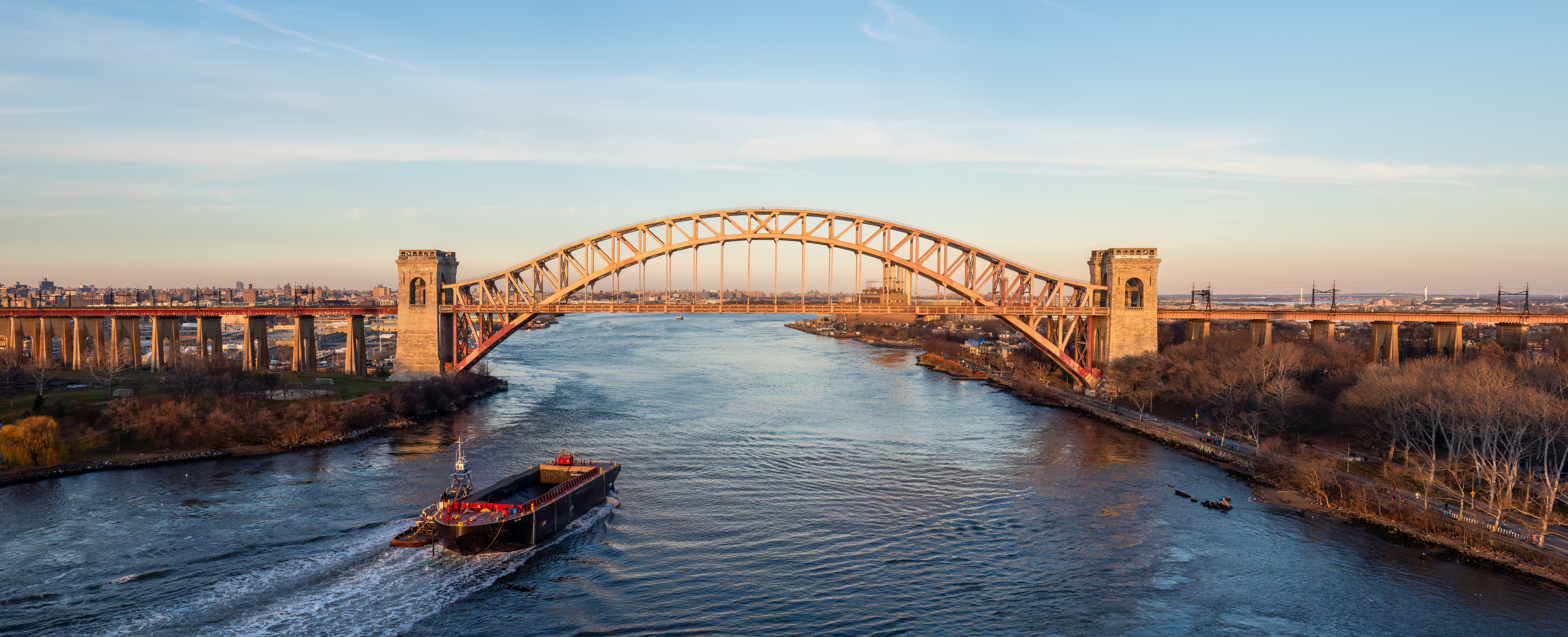
- The main span above Hell Gate
- Coordinates: 40°46′57″N 73°55′19″W
- Carries: Northeast Corridor and New York Connecting Railroad
- Crosses: Hell Gate, Little Hell Gate, Bronx Kill
- Locale: Queens, Randall's and Wards Islands, and the Bronx; New York City, U.S.
- Owner: Amtrak
- Maintained by: Amtrak

Characteristics
- Design: Through arch bridge (main span); Inverted bowstring truss (Little Hell Gate span); Truss bridge (Bronx Kill span)
- Material: Steel
- Total length: 17,000 ft (3.2 mi; 5.2 km) (including approaches)
- Width: 100 ft (30.5 m)
- Longest span: 1,017 ft (310 m)
- Clearance below: 135 ft (41.1 m)

Rail characteristics
- No. of tracks: 3: 2 for Amtrak Northeast Corridor; 1 for CSX, CP, and P&W
- Track gauge: 4 ft 8 1/2 in (1,435 mm) standard gauge
- Structure gauge: AAR
- Electrified: 12.5 kV 60 Hz AC catenary (Northeast Corridor only)

History
- Architect: Henry Hornbostel
- Designer: Gustav Lindenthal
- Constructed by: American Bridge Company
- Fabrication by: American Bridge Company
- Construction start: 1912
- Construction end: 1916
- Opened: March 9, 1917; 109 years ago

Location
- Interactive map of Hell Gate Bridge

The Hell Gate Bridge (originally the New York Connecting Railroad Bridge) is a railroad bridge in New York City. The bridge carries two tracks of Amtrak's Northeast Corridor and one freight track between Astoria, Queens, and Port Morris, Bronx, via Randalls and Wards Islands. Its main span is a 1,017-foot (310 m) steel through arch across Hell Gate, a strait of the East River that separates Wards Island from Queens. The bridge also includes several approach viaducts and two spans across smaller waterways; including these spans, the bridge is 17,000 feet (5,200 m) long. It is one of the few rail connections from Long Island, of which Queens is part, to the continental United States. (Note: Long Island's railways have only two physical connections to the mainland. The other link to the mainland is via Penn Station, which first goes through Manhattan and then splits off into two lines, both of which lead to the mainland. There is also a rail freight barge service between Brooklyn and New Jersey operated by New York New Jersey Rail, LLC.)

The New York Connecting Railroad (NYCR) was formed in 1892 to build the bridge, linking New Jersey and the Pennsylvania Railroad (PRR) with New England and the New York, New Haven, and Hartford Railroad (NH). A cantilever bridge across Hell Gate was proposed in 1900, but the plan was changed to a through-arch bridge after repeated delays. Construction was overseen by the engineers Gustav Lindenthal, Othmar Ammann, and David B. Steinman and architect Henry Hornbostel. The bridge was dedicated on March 9, 1917, and was the world's longest steel arch bridge until the Bayonne Bridge opened in 1931. Various proposals to modify the bridge in the 1920s were unsuccessful. The bridge was renovated in the 1990s following three decades of deterioration.

The main span is a two-hinged arch flanked by stone towers on either bank of Hell Gate. Northwest of the Hell Gate span, the viaduct is carried on plate-girder spans along the east side of Wards and Randalls Islands. A four-span inverted bowstring truss bridge, measuring 1,154 feet (352 m), carries the railroad tracks across Little Hell Gate, a former stream between Randalls and Wards Islands. Further north is a 350-foot (110 m), two-span truss bridge across Bronx Kill, a small strait separating Randalls Island from the Bronx. There are also steel-and-concrete approach viaducts in the Bronx and Queens. In addition to the three existing tracks on the bridge, there was a fourth track used by freight trains until the 1970s. The passenger tracks have been electrified since c. 1918, and the freight tracks also had electrification from 1927 to 1969. The Hell Gate Bridge has received commentary both for its design and its impact on Long Island's commerce, and its design inspired that of the Sydney Harbour Bridge.

== Development ==
=== Planning ===
At the end of the 19th century, there was no direct rail connection between New England and New Jersey, nor between Long Island and the rest of the continental United States. Trains traveling between any of these locations had to use barges, which traversed New York City's congested waterways. This spurred efforts to link the Pennsylvania Railroad (PRR), which operated to New Jersey and other states, with the New York, New Haven, and Hartford Railroad (New Haven; NH), which operated to New England. At the time, the NH had a freight terminal in Port Morris, Bronx, where car floats transported railroad cars down the East River to Manhattan or New Jersey. Although the PRR's North River Tunnels and East River Tunnels (completed in 1910) allowed passenger trains to travel between Long Island and New Jersey, no railroad line yet existed between Long Island and New England. Passengers traveling along the modern-day Northeast Corridor had to take a ferry from New Jersey and cross Manhattan to Grand Central Terminal, or vice versa, to continue their journey.

==== 1890s progress ====
The New York Connecting Railroad (NYCR), headed by Oliver W. Barnes, was incorporated in April 1892 to build the bridge. Throughout the 1890s, the New York State Legislature considered various bills that would give the NYCR a franchise to construct a bridge from Long Island to the U.S. mainland, but to no avail. The NYCR planned for the bridge to carry a line from Manhattan to Brooklyn. In March 1898, U.S. representative John H. Ketcham proposed legislation to allow the NYCR to erect a bridge with two or more tracks across the Bronx Kill, Little Hell Gate, and Hell Gate waterways, connecting the Bronx (on the U.S. mainland) with Randalls Island, Wards Island, and Long Island. Although the federal government of the United States required that the clearance below any bridge across the East River (of which the Hell Gate was part) be 150 feet (46 m) above mean high water, the bill permitted a bridge as low as 140 feet (43 m) above mean high water.

By the beginning of 1899, the NYCR had received estimates for a bridge connecting Port Morris in the Bronx, Randalls Island, Wards Islands, and Astoria in Long Island. The 800-foot-long (240 m), 150-foot-high (46 m) bridge was to connect the New York Central Railroad and NH lines in the Bronx with the Long Island Rail Road (LIRR) and South Brooklyn Railway lines on Long Island. A state senator introduced a bill in February 1899 to incorporate the Wards Island Bridge Company to construct the bridge. The following month, the NYCR's directors held a meeting with New York Central's directors about the construction of the line. The New York Central expressed interest in the planned Hell Gate Bridge, as the railroad intended to use it for both passenger and freight traffic.

==== Cantilever plan ====
The New York State Legislature passed a bill in April 1900, authorizing the NYCR to build a bridge from the Port Morris station in the Bronx to the Bushwick Junction station in Queens, and New York governor Theodore Roosevelt signed the bill the next month. Alfred P. Boller drew up plans for a cantilever bridge. The cantilever span was to measure 1,448 feet (441 m) long, 30 feet (9.1 m) wide, and 136 feet (41 m) high; the project, including 7 miles (11 km) of approach tracks, was to cost $5.5 million. (Note: About $175 million in 2025 (Note: Johnston, Louis; Williamson, Samuel H. (2023). "What Was the U.S. GDP Then?". MeasuringWorth. United States Gross Domestic Product deflator figures follow the MeasuringWorth series.)) The cantilever design was selected because it was cheaper than a suspension bridge of the same length. Construction of the bridge was to have begun in September 1900 and be completed in five years. Merchants from Brooklyn supported the bridge, saying it would reduce the cost of delivering goods to that borough. The bridge would also enable passenger trains from upstate New York and New England to travel to New Jersey via the East River and North River tunnels. Freight traffic would still be required to use car floats, as trains would not be able to fit into the tunnels; the car-float operation would be shifted south to Bay Ridge, Brooklyn, where trains would be floated across the New York Bay to Greenville, Jersey City.

By October 1900, grading of land for the bridge and its approach viaducts had commenced, and public hearings about the bridge were being hosted. Initially, the PRR did not intend to use the bridge, and the crossing was to connect with the trackage of the LIRR. After the PRR's acquisition of the LIRR in 1900, the PRR began contemplating taking control of the Hell Gate Bridge. Ultimately, in 1901, the PRR and NH bought the NYCR. This was part of a larger plan to improve rail infrastructure in the New York City area, including a "belt line" for freight (now the Fremont Secondary and Bay Ridge Branch), of which the bridge was to be a part.

Work on the belt line was about to begin by early 1902, and surveys for the proposed bridge's piers had been made by the end of the year. The PRR announced in February 1903 that it would build a double-tracked cantilever bridge, and it drew up a contract to order 30,500 short tons (27,200 long tons; 27,700 t) of steel from United States Steel. The bridge's 840-foot (260 m) central span would have been the world's longest cantilever span. The Port Chester Journal described the planned crossing as "an unusual bridge in point of engineering skill". The PRR requested a perpetual franchise for the bridge from the New York City Rapid Transit Commission that June. PRR vice president Samuel Rea requested in March 1904 that the Rapid Transit Commission approve the bridge and belt line, and charge the PRR rent, so work could commence as soon as possible. That June, the Rapid Transit Commission granted a perpetual franchise for the bridge and belt line to the NYCR. The connecting railroad was to pay the New York City government a fee to cross the East River.

==== Arch plan ====
The PRR hired New York City bridge commissioner Gustav Lindenthal as its consulting structural engineer in 1904. To avoid hospitals on Wards Island, the viaduct needed to curve north immediately upon reaching Wards Island; this ruled out the original cantilever design, which required a straight "anchor span". Instead, Lindenthal first considered a continuous truss bridge, a suspension bridge, and a cantilever bridge across Hell Gate. After rejecting all three designs, Lindenthal studied designs for a spandrel arch and a cantilever arch, both of which would be cheaper than either the suspension or cantilever proposals. The crescent-arch design would be thicker at its crown than at either end, while the spandrel-arch design would be thicker at its ends than at the crown. Although the crescent-arch design required less steel, Lindenthal liked the design of the spandrel arch because it appeared sturdier and because it complemented his designs for masonry towers at either end. Ultimately, he chose a modified form of the spandrel-arch design. His assistant Othmar Ammann wrote that the arch design would allow the bridge to serve as a figurative portal to the Port of New York and New Jersey.

In early 1905, the PRR sent engineers and workers to make borings for the bridge's foundation in Astoria. Work on the bridge's superstructure was delayed because the New York City Board of Aldermen would not approve several aspects of the franchise, prompting an unsuccessful proposal to remove the aldermen's ability to grant franchises. Among other things, the aldermen wanted trains on the bridge to use electric power exclusively, provide space for vehicles and pedestrians, and the city to be allowed to add utility wires to the bridge. New York Governor Frank W. Higgins signed a bill in mid-1905, allowing the start of construction to be postponed by several months. That November, the NYCR asked the Rapid Transit Commission to renew its application for a franchise, citing delays from the Board of Aldermen. The negotiations over the franchise sometimes turned contentious, but the PRR ultimately was promised a franchise from the city in December 1906. By then, the bridge was planned to fit four tracks, though only two would be used initially. The original two-track plan had been changed after the architects found that the cost of converting a two-track bridge to four tracks would be much higher than the upfront cost of a four-track bridge.

The New York City Board of Estimate approved the NYCR's franchise in February 1907. Rea submitted plans for the arch bridge in May 1907 to the city's Municipal Art Commission. The arch would have a clear span of 1,000 feet (300 m), the longest of its kind in the world, and would carry two passenger tracks and two freight tracks. The remainder of the bridge would be a viaduct made of reinforced concrete and steel plate girders. The plans were drawn up by consulting engineer Gustav Lindenthal and architects Palmer and Hornbostel. That June, the Rapid Transit Commission voted to amend the NYCR's franchise. The franchise allowed the NYCR to construct a viaduct across Wards Island, placing the railroad in possible conflict with the New York State Hospital Commission, which had leased the island from the city, although the hospital commission ultimately did allow engineers to survey the island. The Municipal Art Commission rejected the original bridge plans in July 1907 as "not artistic".

==== Land acquisition and finalization of plans ====
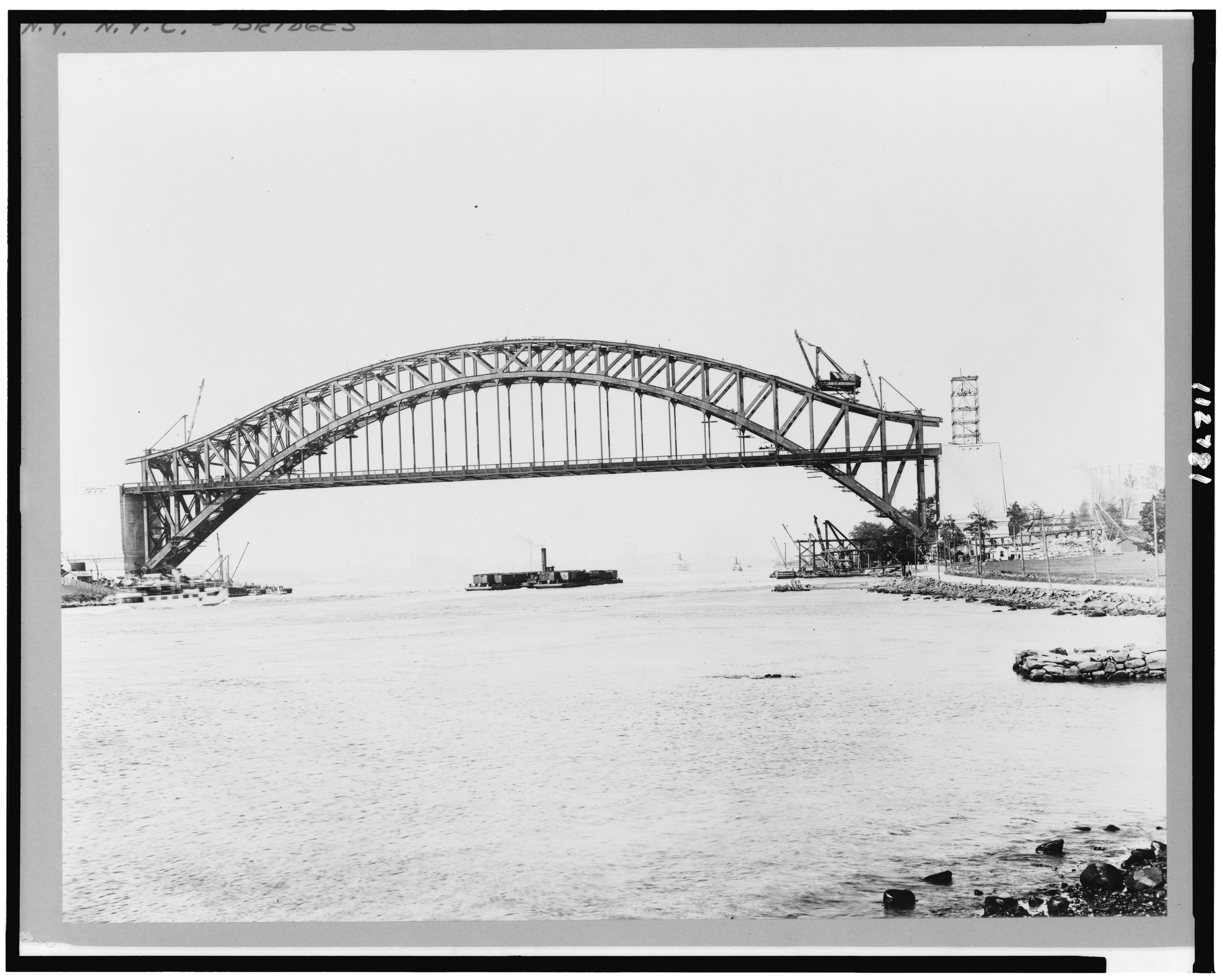
The main span's arch, as ultimately approved

During the late 1900s, the NH and PRR acquired land for the bridge's right-of-way. The first house in the bridge's right-of-way was relocated at the beginning of 1908. The Pennsylvania Railroad announced in December 1908 that, as soon as Pennsylvania Station in Manhattan was completed, the railroad would begin constructing the bridge. The bridge was to cost up to $20 million. (Note: About $505 million in 2025) By early 1909, the NH had acquired all of the necessary land for the Bronx approach, while the PRR was still acquiring land in Queens for both the passenger and freight lines. The PRR agreed to buy the last piece of land for the Queens approach that July, at which point the cost of the bridge had increased to $25 million. (Note: About $640 million in 2025) The NYCR's engineers prepared new plans for the main span's piers the same year. That December, the PRR and NH agreed to share the cost of the bridge's construction. The Hell Gate Bridge was to be the fifth bridge across the East River (after the Brooklyn, Manhattan, Williamsburg, and Queensboro bridges), as well as the first built by a private company rather than the city government.

By early 1910, the plans for the arch's piers were being revised, and surveyors were studying the route of the bridge and its approaches. The plans for the steelwork were revised the same year to accommodate a heavier type of trackbed. The PRR, NH, and LIRR were concurrently finalizing contracts for the construction of the NYCR line, which had commenced in mid-1910. The revised plans for the main span were not submitted to the Municipal Art Commission until early 1911, and a contract for the bridge's steel had still not been awarded. The PRR took title to the last remaining land lots in Queens in June 1911. By the end of the year, the designs for the Bronx Kill and Little Hell Gate spans were still being revised, and land condemnation for the bridge was nearly finished. Lindenthal estimated in late 1911 that the bridge would cost $18 million (Note: About $452 million in 2025) and be completed in 1914. The Municipal Art Commission ultimately approved the revised plans.

=== Construction ===
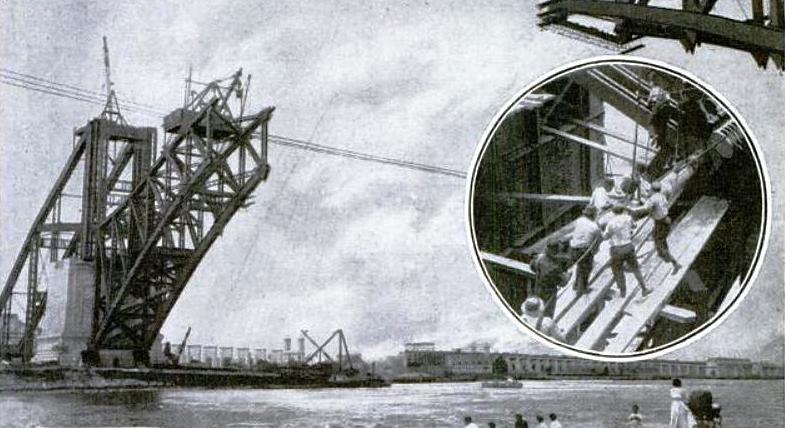
Bridge under construction c. 1915

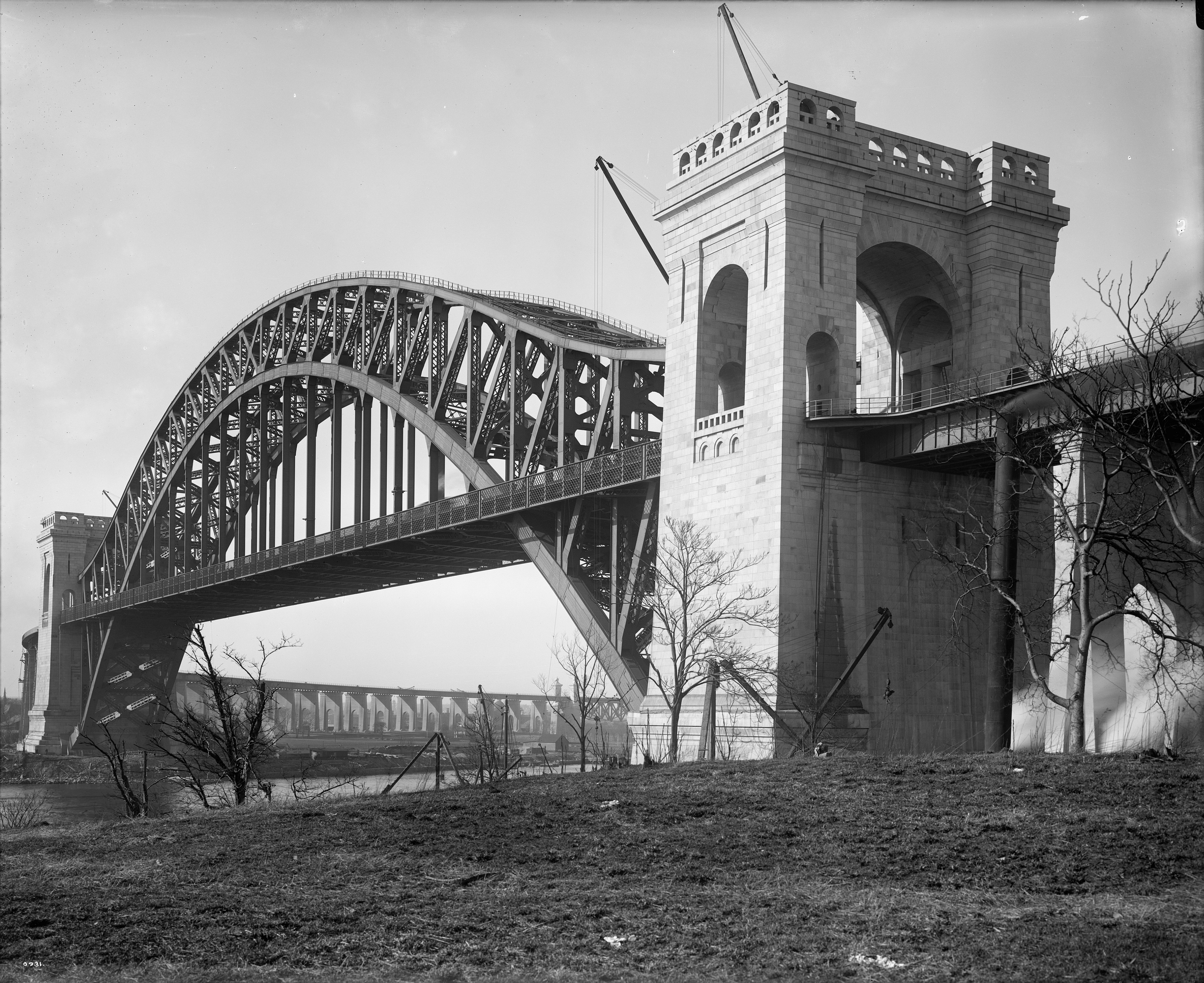
Bridge seen c. 1917

==== Initial contracts ====
Excavations for the Astoria end of the main span, across Hell Gate, commenced in March 1911, and were nearly completed by the end of the year. The American Bridge Company received a contract for the steelwork on the Hell Gate span, Wards Island viaduct, and Queens approach viaduct, while the McClintic-Marshall Company was hired to manufacture steel for the other parts of the bridge. The Carnegie Steel Company was hired in early 1912 to roll the steel plates for the bridge. Later that year, Patrick Ryan, the Manhattan Bridge's main contractor, received a $2 million (Note: About $48 million in 2025) contract to build the bridge's foundation, while John A. Gray received a contract to complete test borings for the bridge. Masonry contracts were awarded to Patrick Ryan (who partnered with U.S. Realty to build the Hell Gate spans' towers), as well as Arthur McMullin and T. A. Gillespie. Harold W. Hudson was the chief construction engineer.

Work formally commenced on the Bronx and Queens approach viaducts in July 1912, and work on the foundations of the main span's towers began that September, though no above-ground work had commenced. By October 1912, workers were preparing to lower caissons for the main span's Wards Island tower, as the underlying layer of rock was over one hundred feet (30 m) deep and was covered by layers of sand, coarse gravel, and boulders. Twenty-one caissons were used to excavate the Wards Island tower's foundation. The caissons were larger and deeper than those used in the construction of the tallest buildings in New York City at the time. The caisson-sinking process was further complicated by the discovery of a diagonal fissure in the underlying rock. It ultimately took seven months to sink the caissons and ensure that the tower would not be susceptible to settlement.

In November 1912, a New York Supreme Court justice enjoined the contractors from erecting abutments on Wards Island. The operators of the Manhattan Psychiatric Center claimed that patients would be disturbed by loud noises, both during construction and after the bridge opened, but the city government claimed that the hospital's lease of the island had expired. The injunction was lifted in January 1913, when the State Supreme Court ruled that the law permitting the bridge's construction overrode the law that restricted railroads above the grounds of a hospital.

==== Pier construction ====
The construction of piers on Randalls and Wards Islands and in Queens began in February 1913. Derricks were used to construct the concrete piers under the Bronx Kill, Randalls Island, Little Hell Gate, and Wards Island spans. The foundations of the Bronx Kill span's piers were constructed using caissons, since the underlying layer of rock was nearly 100 feet (30 m) deep. The foundations of the Little Hell Gate span's piers were built in open cofferdams due to the shallowness of that strait. The contractor built a dock on Wards Island to load and unload material. Derricks carried solid materials from the dock to a conveyor belts, which in turn led to covered storage bins, while cement was poured down a chute to a cement house next to the storage bins. Sand, stone, and cement from the bins were dumped into "charging cars" and carried to a mixing plant, where the material was mixed into concrete. Elevators were used to transport concrete to the top of each pier.

By July 1913, some of the piers and retaining walls for the Bronx and Queens viaducts had been constructed, and contractors had installed temporary plants on Randalls and Wards Islands. The next month, the PRR and NH announced that the NYCR would issue a $30 million mortgage and $11 million in bonds (Note: The mortgage would be about $718 million, while the bonds would be $718 million in 2025) to fund the construction of the Hell Gate Bridge and associated lines; the railroads had spent $8.6 million (Note: About $206 million in 2025) to date on the bridge. The bonds were issued later that year. During a site visit in mid-1914, a local civic group noted that a temporary span had been finished across Bronx Kill and that piers were being built within the riverbed of Little Hell Gate. The main span's towers had reached the height of the deck by the end of 1914, while almost all of the other piers had been completed by then.

==== Steelwork and completion ====
Steel girders and plates for the Little Hell Gate and Bronx Kill spans were being installed by late 1914. The girders under the two center tracks were installed first. Afterward, the center tracks were laid, and a derrick car and a locomotive crane were placed on opposite spans. The derrick car delivered girders that had already been riveted together, and the locomotive crane installed the girders for the outer tracks. The arched main span above Hell Gate was technically challenging because Hell Gate was a navigable waterway, and the arch could not be constructed using falsework. Consequently, massive temporary backstays were built behind both of the Hell Gate towers to cantilever the two pieces of the arch. To accommodate the backstays, the tops of the towers and some adjacent piers could not be completed until after the Hell Gate span was finished. After the backstays were constructed, movable derricks were installed atop the backstays.

One thousand workers and 40 engineers began installing the steelwork of the arch in November 1914; many of the laborers were Mohawk Native American ironworkers from Quebec and upstate New York. Work proceeded in two sections from either shore toward the middle of Hell Gate. The main span consisted of 23 panels, which were installed by the derricks atop the backstays. The panels were composed of steel pieces that weighed as much as 185 short tons (165 long tons; 168 t). The steel pieces were manufactured off-site and, at the time, were among the heaviest steel pieces ever manufactured. Each piece was delivered to the site via car floats, then transported up via derricks. To counteract sagging caused by the weight of the panels, both halves of the bridge occasionally had to be adjusted. The project as a whole was declared half-finished in July 1915. The last pieces of the lower chord were installed during the week of September 28 to October 4, 1915, and both halves were officially joined on October 1. The gap between the two parts of the arch was just 5/16 inch (7.9 mm). The extreme precision was attributed to the level of detail in the engineering drawings, as well as the use of highly precise surveying tools made by the W. & L. E. Gurley Company.

The completion of the arch made the Hell Gate span the longest steel arch in the world. The hydraulic jacks were removed from the towers, and the backstays were disassembled and reused in the approach viaducts. Workers began driving 400,000 rivets into the arched span; Lindenthal claimed that they were among the largest rivets ever used. Due to cold weather, the upper chord of the arch could not be riveted together until May 1916. Locomotive cranes constructed the remaining portions of the viaducts. By mid-October 1916, the PRR and NH anticipated that passenger service would commence at the beginning of 1917. Finishing touches were placed on the bridge during late 1916. In total, the bridge cost $18.5 million. (Note: About $378 million in 2025) Before the bridge's official opening, police forces patrolled it to prevent sabotage during World War I.

== Operational history ==
=== Opening ===
The first train ran across the bridge at a dedication ceremony on March 9, 1917, on a track constructed for the occasion. The Hell Gate Bridge was not complete; workers were still laying tracks, and the line was not electrified. Intercity passenger trains began running on April 1 with the rerouting of the NH's Federal Express via the bridge. The Hell Gate span was the world's longest steel arch bridge until the Bayonne Bridge, between New York and New Jersey, was completed in 1931. Its completion enabled passengers to travel the length of the Northeast Corridor without having to transfer to a ferry. Ammann initially estimated that the bridge would be mostly used by freight trains, because capacity constraints at Pennsylvania Station limited the bridge's two passenger tracks to 80 trains a day, and because most NH trains were planned to continue running to Grand Central.

In mid-1917, NYCR applied for permission to issue $1.5 million (Note: About $25 million in 2025) in bonds to finish the bridge. The bridge started carrying other routes in late 1917, such as the PRR's Colonial Express, the Washington-Bar Harbor Express, and a short-lived St. Louis–Pittsburgh–Boston route. Commuter services continued to run to Grand Central Terminal. Though the bridge only carried rail traffic when it opened, it could also be adapted for pedestrian and car traffic. By the end of 1917, all four tracks were complete, and freight trains began running across the bridge in January 1918. At the time, the Brooklyn Daily Eagle wrote that the bridge would be able to accommodate 240 freight cars daily. The passenger tracks were also electrified by 1918.

During World War I, when the federal government took control of railroad lines in the U.S., the New York Central began using the Hell Gate Bridge, allowing Long Island merchants to send products directly to the mainland via any railroad. The bridge was carrying only four passenger trains per day by September 1918, amid the war. The media wrote that, due to its low use, the bridge's construction cost was unlikely to be recouped. As late as 1919, the bridge was still carrying very limited passenger service because of wartime restrictions that diverted train traffic. The New York Central stopped using the bridge in November 1920 after the PRR and NH raised the bridge's freight-transport fees, and the New York Central began using car floats to Long Island instead.

=== 1920s proposals ===
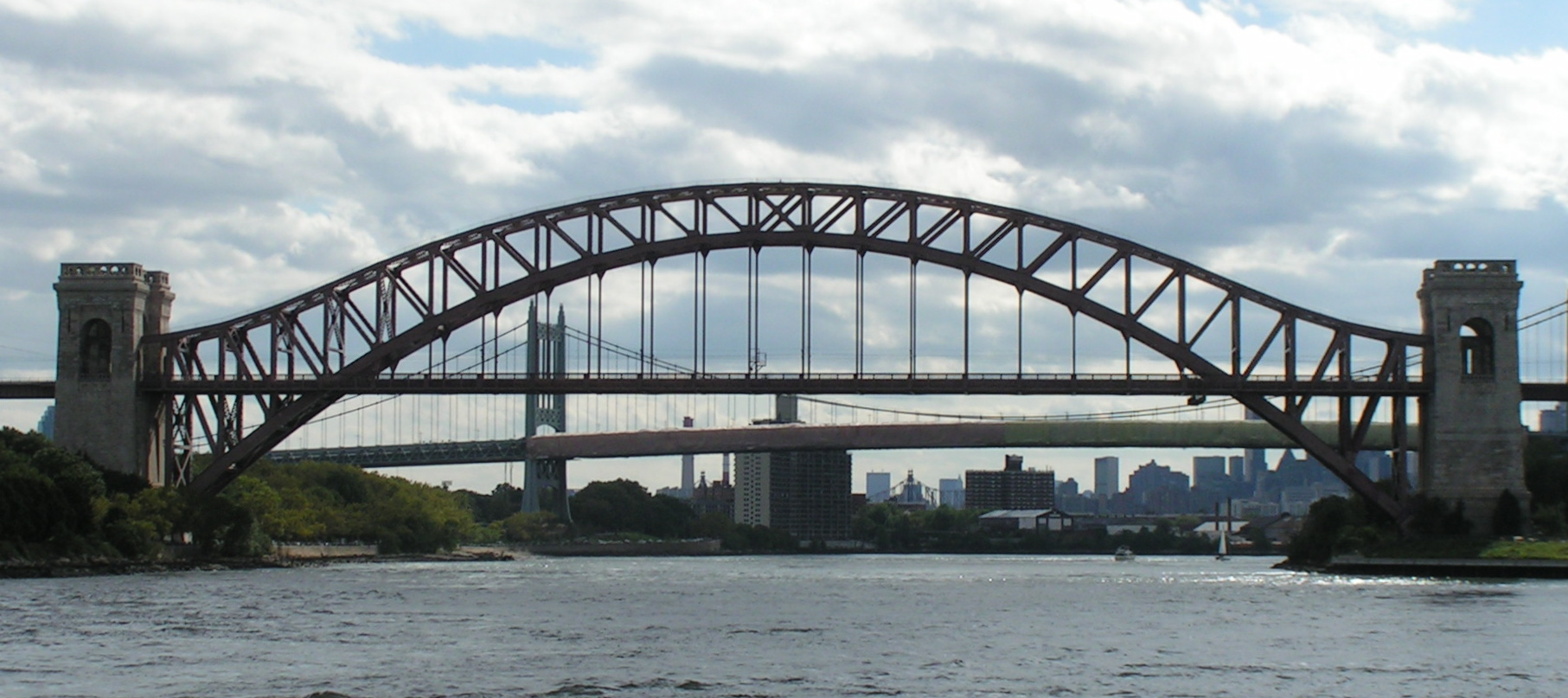
The Hell Gate Bridge's main span in front of the Robert F. Kennedy Bridge's suspension span

When the Triborough (now RFK) Bridge nearby was first proposed in 1920, Lindenthal suggested that the Hell Gate Bridge's main span could be retrofitted with an upper deck for vehicular and pedestrian use, a proposal that he repeated in 1924. Civic organizations across the city supported the extra deck, and the engineering firm of Robinson and Steinman conducted a study, finding that it was feasible to add the deck. In late 1926, mayor Jimmy Walker appointed a committee to consider the plan. Albert Goldman, the Commissioner of Plant and Structures, estimated that the Hell Gate Bridge only had enough space for five lanes of roadway, so a new bridge would have to be constructed parallel to it. Accordingly, the Triborough Bridge was proposed as an entirely new bridge in March 1927, and that span would open in 1936.

Meanwhile, the Port of New York Authority, which sought to increase the number of freight trains that used the Hell Gate Bridge, hosted hearings in late 1924 to determine whether New York Central freight trains should be allowed to use the bridge, The Brooklyn Chamber of Commerce and Long Island shippers endorsed the proposal, while the LIRR, NH, and PRR opposed it. The Port Authority ordered the PRR and NH to allow New York Central Trains on the bridge in February 1925. The order was modified to exclude freight to and from New England, but the PRR and NH still refused to allow the New York Central to use the bridge after thirty days. A spur route from the bridge, which would have allowed trains from the Bronx to travel to a new terminal in Long Island City, was proposed the same year. PRR officials opposed the plan because it would strain the capacity of the bridge's two western tracks, and ultimately the spur was canceled. By the end of 1925, the bridge was carrying 1,200 freight cars per day.

In early 1926, the Port Authority asked the Interstate Commerce Commission (ICC) to allow all freight trains on the bridge. The PRR and NH again opposed the move, and the PRR argued that allowing other railroads' trains on the bridge would discourage railroads from improving routes used by competitors. ICC examiners recommended opening the bridge only to freight trains toward Long Island; at the time, traffic to Long Island constituted 88 percent of the island's freight traffic volume. The Port Authority continued to advocate for allowing all railroads to use the bridge in both directions. The freight tracks were electrified in 1927. The Port Authority also asked the ICC to lower the fees charged on freight trains using the bridge. The ICC ruled in 1928 that the railroads were not required to lower their rates but that they were required to allow other railroads to use the bridge during emergencies or when other routes were congested.

=== 1930s to 1960s ===
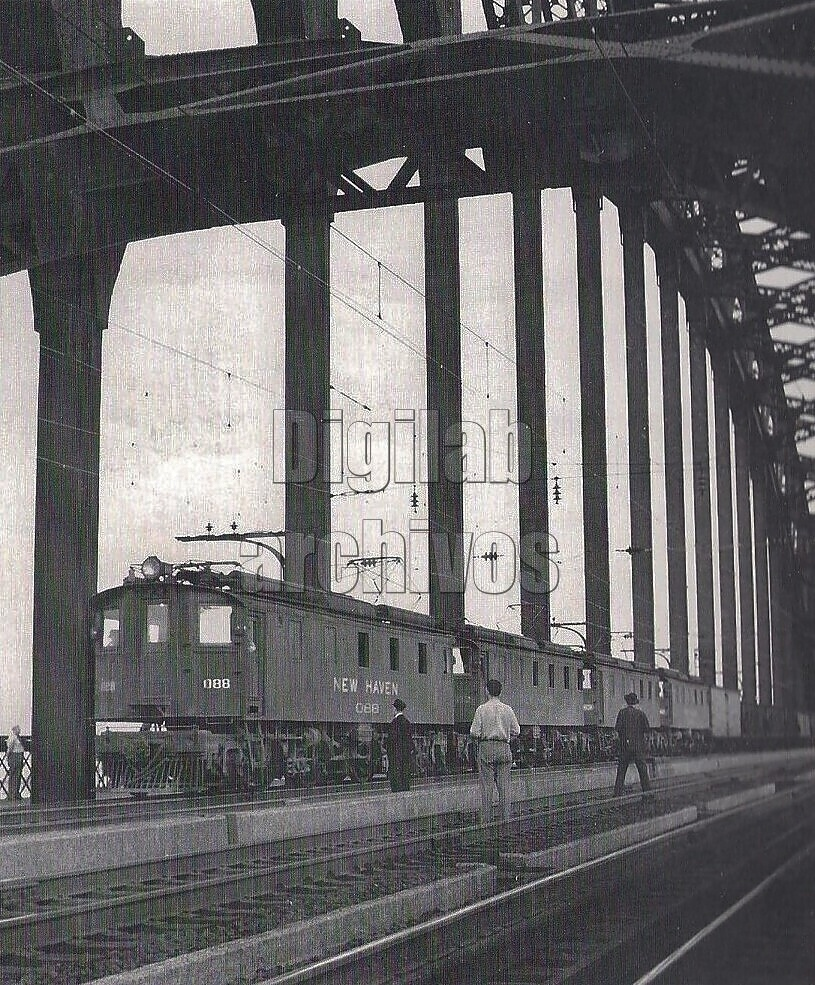
A freight train on the bridge, 1948

By 1932, residents of Long Island were advocating for the construction of a second rail link between their island and the Bronx, due to the lack of direct freight service to eastern Long Island via the Hell Gate Bridge. The same year, the ICC hosted hearings over whether to run passenger trains over the bridge between eastern Long Island and New England; the ICC ultimately rejected a Long Island–New England passenger train as impractical, inconvenient, and of little benefit. In 1934, the NH put up its share of the bridge as collateral for a $6 million (Note: About $113 million in 2025) loan from the Reconstruction Finance Corporation. The NH was allowed to take back its portion of the bridge even if the RFC foreclosed on the loan; the NH declared bankruptcy the next year, remaining under trusteeship until 1947.

During World War II, in 1940, officials disarmed a live bomb under the Hell Gate Bridge. The bridge's economic value made it a target of Operation Pastorius, a Nazi sabotage plan, which was thwarted in 1942. The NYCR began leasing out land around the bridge's approach viaducts to nearby property owners in the 1940s. The property owners paid an annual fee and were obliged to maintain the land. Additionally, passengers had to pay a surcharge on tickets for train trips that used the bridge, unless they were traveling to or from New York City; the surcharge had resulted an estimated $20.9 million (Note: About $222 million in 2025) in revenue for the bridge from 1920 to 1950. The surcharge prompted investigations from the ICC in the mid-1940s and again in 1951, but the surcharge was upheld both times.

Train traffic in the U.S. started to decrease in the mid-20th century as a result of increased automobile usage. This adversely affected both of the NYCR's co-owners and caused the bridge to fall into disrepair. The NH had declared bankruptcy in 1961 but continued to own a 50% stake in the bridge. A feasibility study on the possible liquidation of the NH found that the bridge's salvage value was equal to the theoretical cost of demolition. The PRR's own issues compelled it to merge with New York Central in 1968, forming the Penn Central Transportation Company, which also included the NH. Penn Central itself filed for bankruptcy in 1970 and was absorbed by Conrail in 1976.

During the 1960s and early 1970s, there were suggestions to transfer ownership of the bridge to the New York City Transit Authority and to run commuter rail across the bridge. In addition, there had been concerns about the bridge's upkeep as early as 1967, when debris from the bridge fell to the ground near Astoria Park. The freight tracks were de-electrified in 1969.

=== 1970s to 1990s ===
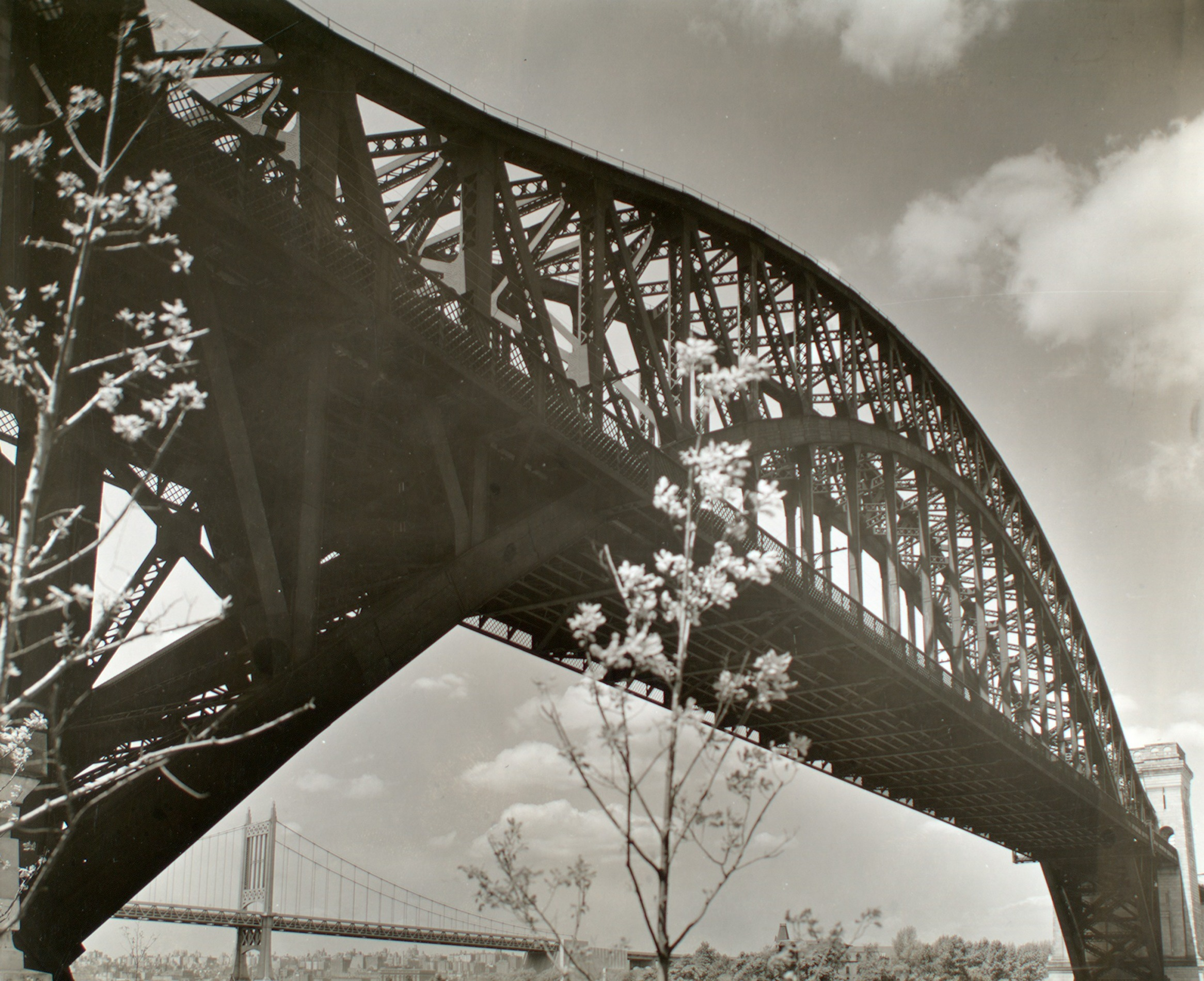
The main span as seen from immediately beside it, within Astoria Park

The New Jersey car float was closed for an extended period during the 1970s, making the Hell Gate Bridge the only way for freight trains to get to and from Long Island during that time. One of the bridge's freight tracks was abandoned during that decade as well. The lack of rail crossings of the Hudson River, to the west, also meant that freight trains from Long Island had to detour to upstate New York just to travel west or south. Freight trains from the west also had to make several tight turns to reach the Hell Gate Bridge. New York state voters approved a bond issue in 1974, which provided $250 million (Note: About $1,268 million in 2025) for numerous upgrades to New York City's railroads. The upgrades included modifications to allow double-stack freight trains to use the Hell Gate Bridge, thereby reducing the need for cargo trucks to travel through the city.

Amtrak took over the bridge itself, and the passenger services that used it, by 1975, while Conrail began operating additional freight trains over it during the same decade. Vandals frequently threw rocks from the bridge and set fires, which had prompted Penn Central, and later Amtrak, to increase security on the bridge. By the late 1970s, debris was falling from the approach viaducts. Due to poor drainage, water had seeped through the viaducts, causing rocks to come loose. City councilman Peter Vallone Sr. and U.S. representative Mario Biaggi advocated for Amtrak to repair the viaducts, saying the conditions threatened local residents' lives. Amtrak started repairing the viaducts in 1978 but paused the repairs the next year. When the project resumed in 1980, workers added welded steel plates on the trackbeds to prevent objects from falling. Even after the repairs were finished, local residents continued to express concerns about the viaduct's structural integrity. Additionally, the bridge's paint was peeling off by the late 1980s. Sources disagree on whether the bridge had last been repainted in 1939 or whether it had never been repainted at all; in either case, Amtrak's own vice president said the bridge should have been repainted three times in the previous half-century.

Vallone asked the federal government to fix the bridge after falling debris broke a car's window in 1988. Vallone and U.S. senator Daniel Patrick Moynihan requested that Amtrak devise a plan for repairing the bridge, though Amtrak officials denied that there was deterioration. The New York Times described the bridge in 1991 as "a flaking and crumbling symbol of urban decay and decline". Moynihan convened a United States Senate hearing in 1990 after attempting to contact Amtrak officials about the bridge; at the hearing, Amtrak officials testified that the bridge did not need repainting. The officials also estimated the cost of repainting at $43 million, (Note: About $86 million in 2025) though Moynihan disputed these estimates. By then, city officials had issued several warnings to pedestrians and drivers about the bridge's safety. The United States Congress allocated $55 million to renovate the bridge in late 1991, which included $42 million for repainting and $13 million for structural improvements. (Note: The total cost was about $116 million in 2025. Of this, $88 million was for repainting, and $27 million was for structural improvements.) In exchange, the New York State Department of Transportation had to provide matching funds for 20 percent of the federal allocation. At the time, 20 Amtrak trains used the bridge every day.

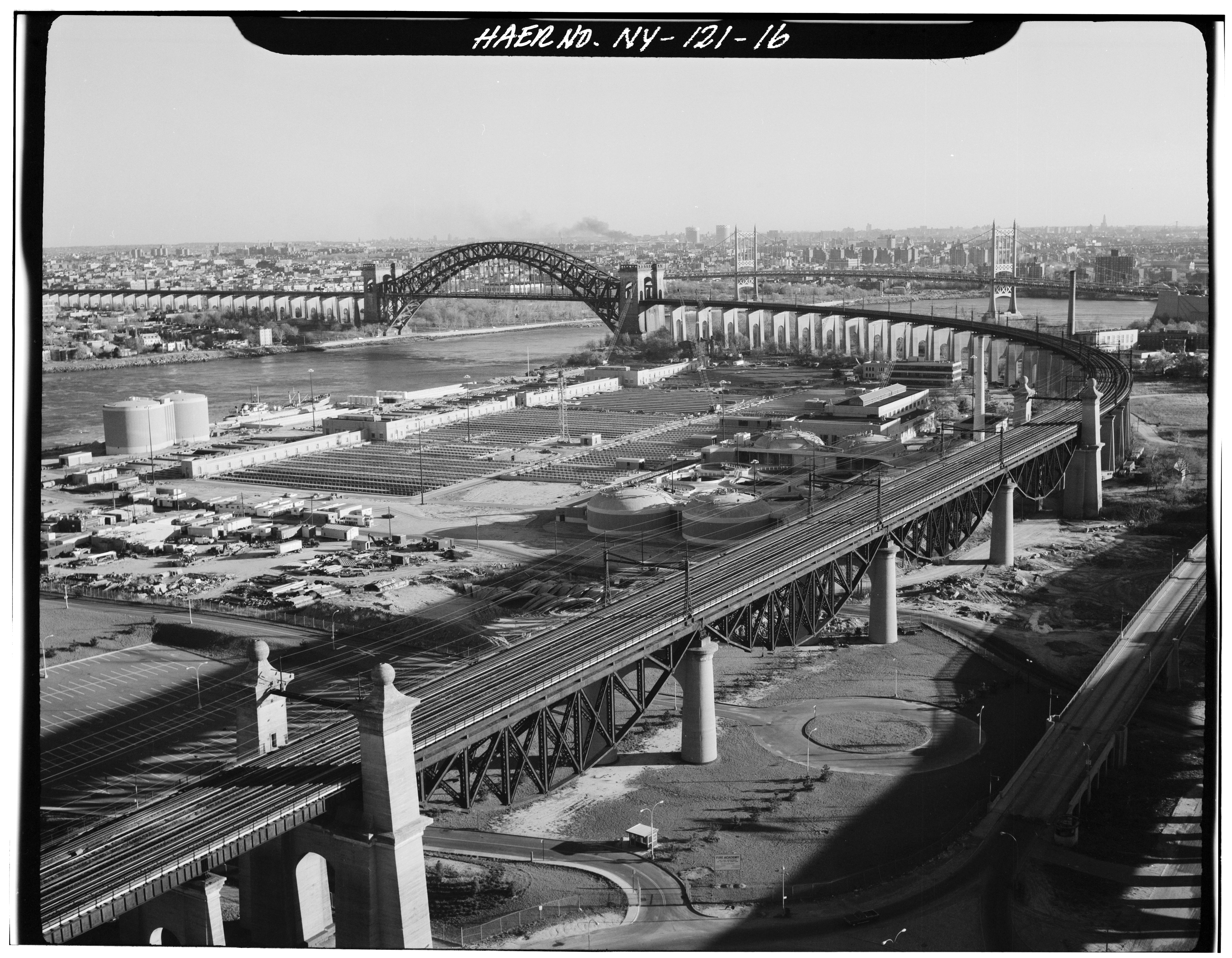
View of the bridge's Queens approach, main span, Wards Island approach, and Little Hell Gate span as seen from Randalls Island, looking south

Workers began renovating the bridge in April 1992; at Moynihan's request, the Municipal Art Society asked six architects and artists to decide the color in which the bridge should be painted. The bridge was repainted a deep red hue known as Hell Gate Red. The paint consisted of two layers of epoxy coating, a urethane layer, and a clear layer to protect against ultraviolet rays and corrosion. Due to a flaw in the paint, the red color began to fade before the work was completed. The repainting was completed in 1996, and graffiti began to appear on the viaducts shortly afterward. Beginning in the 1990s, local residents and students painted several murals under the Queens approach viaduct. Providence and Worcester Railroad freight trains carrying stone from quarries in Connecticut began using the bridge in 1996 to reach Long Island. The Oak Point Link near the bridge's Bronx end was completed in 1998, allowing freight trains from the Hudson Line (to the west) to access the bridge without having to make multiple tight turns. In addition, as part of the 1998 Transportation Equity Act for the 21st Century, Congress allocated $15 million (Note: About $28 million in 2025) to repaint the bridge. By then, 34 Amtrak trains used the bridge daily.

=== 2000s to present ===
In the first decade of the 21st century, the bridge carried around 41 passenger trains per weekday, as well as less frequent freight-train service. Debris still fell from the bridge's approach viaducts due to both vandalism and general neglect, and Vallone said in 2001 that the paint had started to peel off. Security on the bridge was increased following the September 11 attacks. In 2002, state government officials announced plans to spend $11.8 million to replace the bridge's freight track so it could support heavier trains. After Peter Vallone Jr. was elected to his father's city council seat, the younger Vallone also unsuccessfully requested that Amtrak repaint the bridge throughout much of the 2000s. Following further reports of cracks and falling debris, Amtrak workers installed steel plates on the trackbed in the mid-2000s. Amtrak proposed raising rental fees for the land under the bridge's approach viaducts in 2006, in some cases as much as 100,000 percent. After further lobbying from the younger Vallone, Amtrak agreed to repair parts of the approach in 2008.

The bridge's paint continued to fade during the 2010s. Local residents also requested that Amtrak add more lighting to the bridge, which was illuminated at night by a small number of lights below the deck. By early 2016, several local politicians were advocating for Amtrak to repaint the bridge in advance of its centennial, citing the fact that various parts of the spans had become discolored. That year, Amtrak increased rental fees for the land under the bridge from tens of dollars to as much as $40,000 a year. The railroad reversed the rent increases following outcry from local residents. The Greater Astoria Historical Society, in conjunction with Amtrak, celebrated the centennial of the bridge's opening in 2017. As part of Penn Station Access, in the 2020s, the Metropolitan Transportation Authority (MTA) began upgrading the Hell Gate Line to accommodate the Metro-North Railroad's New Haven Line.

== Description ==
The bridge's five spans and two approach viaducts: Bronx approach viaduct; Bronx Kill span; Randalls and Wards Islands spans; Little Hell Gate span; Hell Gate (main) span; Queens approach viaduct

The Hell Gate Bridge was originally known as the New York Connecting Railroad Bridge or as the East River Bridge Division. It consists of five spans, which connect the New York City boroughs of the Bronx to the north with Queens to the south. Three of the spans cross the Hell Gate, Little Hell Gate, and the Bronx Kill waterways, while the other two spans run above Randalls and Wards Islands. Including approach viaducts in the Bronx and Queens, the Hell Gate Bridge is composed of seven sections. Together with approaches, the bridge has been cited as being 15,840 feet (3.0 mi; 4.8 km), more than 17,000 feet (3.2 mi; 5.2 km), or 3.38 miles (17,800 ft; 5.44 km) long. Gustav Lindenthal was the chief engineer for the bridge; he was assisted by the engineers Othmar Ammann and David B. Steinman. In addition, Henry Hornbostel was the bridge's architect.

The Hell Gate Bridge is used exclusively as a railroad bridge, carrying passenger trains traveling between New York Penn Station and the Bronx, as well as freight trains heading between Queens and the Bronx. The Hell Gate Bridge parallels the Hell Gate and Bronx Kill legs of the Robert F. Kennedy (formerly Triborough) Bridge to the west. The span across Hell Gate is oriented roughly from northwest to southeast, while the other two spans are oriented from northeast to southwest. The bridge was built with provisions for an upper level if the need arose. The entire bridge required 90,000 short tons (80,000 long tons; 82,000 t) of steel and 460,000 cubic yards (350,000 m^{3}; 12,000,000 ft^{3}) of concrete. The decks of each span are all made of concrete panels, which carry track beds with ballast; this was intended to reduce noise pollution and is unusual for a railroad bridge. The February 2005 issue of Discover magazine estimated that, if humans were to disappear, the bridge could last for at least a millennium; most other bridges would fall in about 300 years.

=== Main span ===
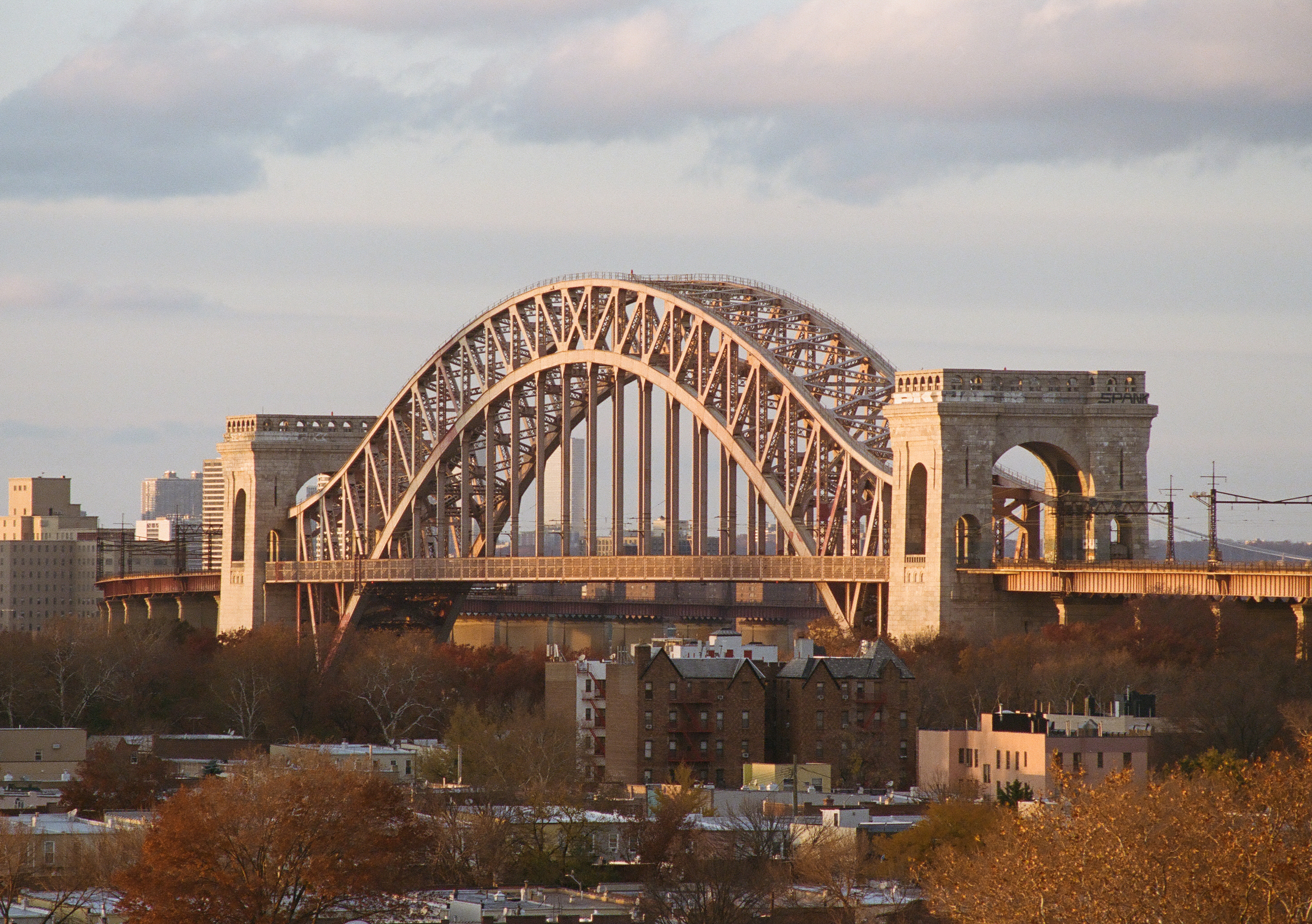
The main span as seen from further east in Queens

The main span is a spandrel arch across the Hell Gate strait, flanked by large stone towers on either bank of the strait. When the main span was completed, it was sometimes referred to specifically as the Hell Gate Bridge or as the East River Arch Bridge.

==== Arch and deck ====
The main span measures 1,017 feet (310 m) long between the outer faces of the masonry "towers" on either side of Hell Gate. The clear span (between the inner faces) is 977.5 feet (297.9 m), while the distance between the centers of these towers is 995 feet (303 m). At the center of the main span, the deck reaches its maximum height, 145 feet (44 m) above mean high water, with a clearance below of 135 feet (41 m). The main span was intended to carry a total load of approximately 76,000 pounds per lineal foot, or 113,000 kilograms per lineal meter. The span uses high-carbon steel because it was cheaper than nickel steel at the time of construction. In total, the main span required between 18,000 and 20,000 short tons (16,000 and 18,000 t) of rolled steel.

The span is a two-hinged arch; there are hinges at the springing points of the arch (at the bases of the towers on either side of Hell Gate). The arch's beams run along the north and south sides of a 60-foot-wide (18 m) deck. On either side of the deck is an upper chord, with an inverted U-shaped cross section, and a lower chord, with a box-shaped cross section. The two chords are 140 feet (43 m) apart at either shore of Hell Gate, narrowing to 40 feet (12 m) apart at the middle of the river. Each lower chord ranges in thickness from approximately 7 to 11 feet (2.1 to 3.4 m), and the thickest sections of the lower chord are divided into two compartments. The upper chord is thinner and functions like a stiffening truss; it is shaped like a hump, both for structural reinforcement and for esthetic purposes. It reaches a maximum height of 300 feet (91 m) or 305 feet (93 m) above mean high water. Beams run vertically and diagonally between the upper and lower chords. There is also transverse bracing between the upper chords and lower chords on either side of the bridge.

Eight stringers, or girders, run parallel to and under the tracks for the entire length of the deck. Four additional stringers were intended to support unbuilt walkways or trolley tracks on either side. These are intersected by 24 transverse floor beams. Sixteen of the transverse beams are suspended from the lower chord, while the other eight beams are riveted to the vertical trusses between the lower and upper chords. Additional girders are used to stabilize the floor of the deck.

==== Towers ====
Hornbostel was responsible for the towers on either shore of Hell Gate, which were designed to resemble castle keeps. They measure 220 feet (67 m) high and are made of concrete; the towers are clad with Maine granite above ground level. At the bases of each tower are two 500,000-pound (230,000 kg) cast-steel hinges, one for each of the lower chords. The Queens tower sits atop a layer of rock 20 feet (6.1 m) below the ground. The layer of rock on the Wards Island side is substantially deeper, descending more than 100 feet (30 m), and so the Wards Island tower sits atop a deep caisson foundation. At ground level, the towers have a cross section of 104 by 140 feet (32 by 43 m). Each tower has a "shoulder", upon which the lower chords rest, and the towers' dimensions shrink above this shoulder.

The upper portions of each tower are hollow and contain staircases. Steel girders inside the towers support the tracks, but the towers are otherwise largely ornamental. The upper section of each tower contains archways on all four sides. There are also loophole-like openings flanking the tracks. The tops of the towers are surrounded by parapets. Space for railroad equipment, such as switch tower machinery, was provided on the roof of each tower.

=== Randalls and Wards Islands viaducts ===
Northwest of the Hell Gate span, the viaduct curves about 90 degrees to the northeast, running along the east side of Wards and Randalls Islands. The viaduct above Wards Island is about 2,650 feet (810 m) long and consists of 30 plate girder sections, which are each between 86 and 93 feet (26 and 28 m) long. (Note: The Brooklyn Daily Eagle gives a slightly different measurement of 87 to 90 feet (27 to 27 m).) Each pier consists of a concrete arch measuring up to 120 feet (37 m) high and around 20 by 65 feet (6.1 by 19.8 m) across at its base. The arches are composed of two legs connected by an arched girder. North of the Wards Island viaduct, trains cross the former Little Hell Gate strait to reach the Randalls Island viaduct. The viaduct across Randalls Island is about 1,965 feet (599 m) long and measures about 75 to 80 feet (23 to 24 m) high. It is supported by concrete arches similar to those on Wards Island. The arches support 24 plate-girder sections that measure between 80 and 87 feet (24 and 27 m) long. (Note: The Brooklyn Daily Eagle gives a slightly different measurement of 22 spans, measuring 80 feet (24 m) long.)

The viaduct ramps down as it continues north from Wards Island to Randalls Island. The original plans for the piers called for them to be made for steel lattices. The metal piers were changed to concrete both because the Municipal Art Commission disapproved of the steel-lattice design, and because there were concerns that the islands' prisoners and psychiatric patients could escape by climbing the trestles. In addition, when the plans for the piers were changed in 1914, metal had become more expensive than concrete.

==== Little Hell Gate Bridge ====
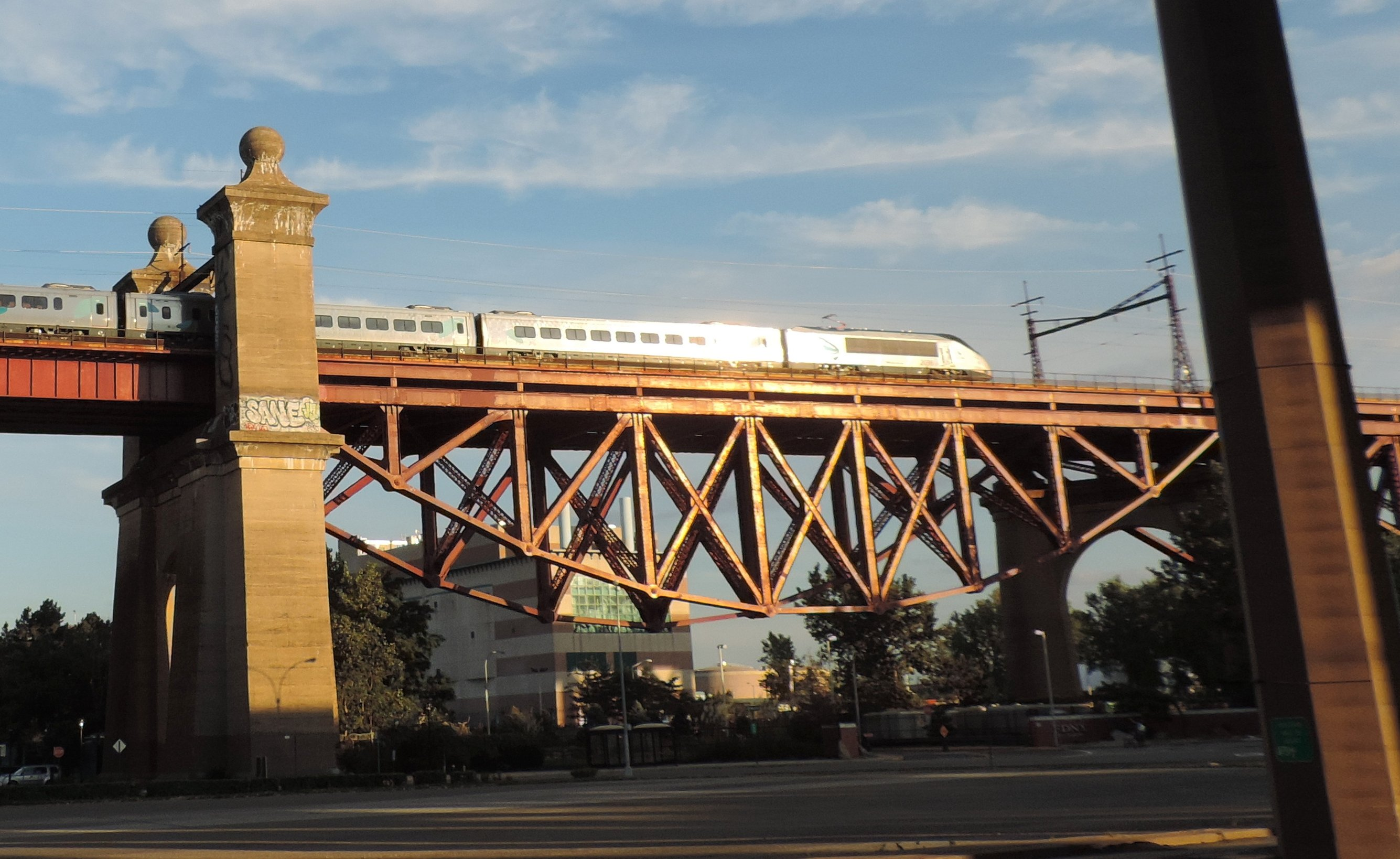
Little Hell Gate span

Between the Randalls and Wards Islands viaducts is the Little Hell Gate Bridge, an inverted bowstring truss bridge. The inverted bowstring truss span is 1,154 feet (352 m) long, as measured from the centers of the abutments on either side. The Little Hell Gate Bridge consists of four sections of nearly equal length, although two are slightly longer than the others. Each section is composed of linked eyebars measuring 16 inches (410 mm) wide.

The bridge is supported by three piers, which are skewed because they follow the former course of Little Hell Gate. Each pier is composed of a reinforced concrete arch held up by two circular columns. The portion of each pier below the former strait's water level is made of granite. Because Little Hell Gate was never a navigable waterway, the United States Department of War had allowed the builders to construct the piers within the strait itself. Little Hell Gate was infilled in the 1960s.

=== Bronx Kill span ===
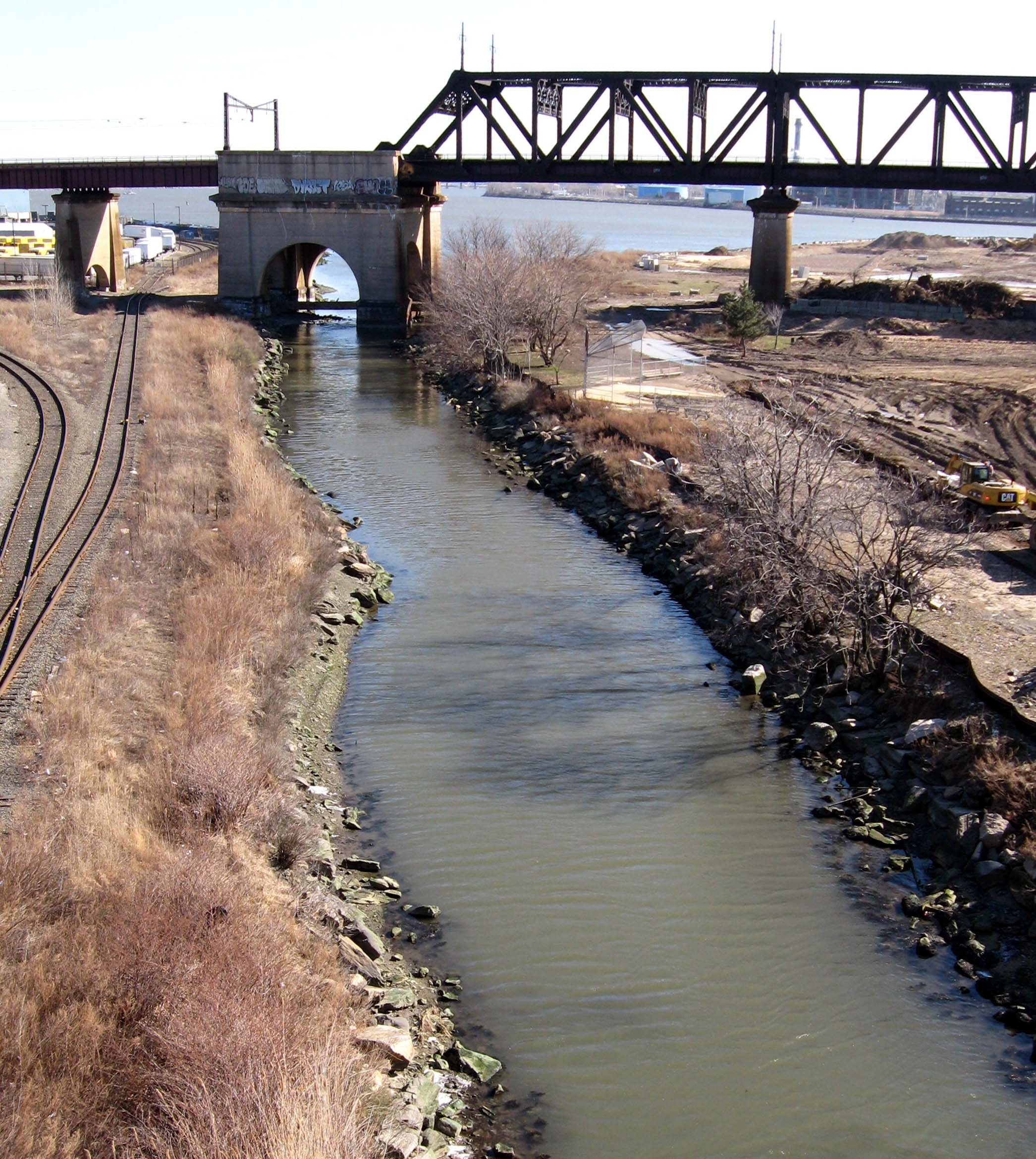
The Hell Gate Bridge's Bronx Kill span. The Bronx Kill is seen running to the left of the span itself.

A 350-foot (110 m) fixed truss bridge crosses the Bronx Kill strait. It consists of two truss sections that are each 175 feet (55 m) long. The span is supported by a central pier between the two trusses, as well as by "tower piers" at either end. The piers are clad with granite below the mean water level and concrete above. Although the center and south piers are placed on solid rock, the north pier is placed on spread footings because the underlying layer of rock descends sharply to the north. The north pier measures 55 feet (17 m) high and 54 feet (16 m) wide, with a large arched opening underneath. Originally, the Bronx Kill passed diagonally under the truss spans.

The Bronx Kill span was planned as a double-leaf bascule drawbridge, although the Bronx Kill was not a navigable waterway even at the time of the bridge's construction. As such, the piers under the span had space for drawbridge machinery, and the span had a clearance below of 63 feet (19 m). Underneath the Bronx Kill span is the Hell Gate Pathway, which continues underneath the Randalls and Wards Islands viaducts.

=== Approach viaducts ===
The height of the arch above Hell Gate required that the line be placed on an elevated viaduct between Long Island City and Port Morris. The viaduct is almost entirely composed of steel and concrete, except for small segments at either end, where the line is carried on an embankment with retaining walls. The steel viaduct is carried on approximately 150 concrete piers.

==== Bronx viaduct ====
In the Bronx, the Hell Gate Bridge has an approach viaduct measuring 4,356 feet (1,328 m) long and descends at a grade of up to 1.2 percent. The NH used helper locomotives during the 20th century to assist freight trains traversing the approach viaduct's grade. The Bronx viaduct merges with the former four-track Port Morris Branch (now the one-track Oak Point Link) at 142nd Street in Port Morris. Separate ramps carry the western and eastern pairs of tracks down to the level of the Port Morris Branch. As built, the western ramp descended between the Port Morris Branch's western and eastern pairs of tracks, while the eastern ramp descended to the east of the Port Morris Branch. Two sets of piers carry the ramps northward from the Bronx Kill span to 132nd Street.

From the Bronx Kill north to 132nd Street, the four-track-wide viaduct consists of plate girders, which rest on concrete piers. Each pier is less than 50 feet (15 m) tall and has an arched opening at the base. The Hell Gate Pathway runs underneath the arches. The viaduct splits into two ramps north of 132nd Street, each with space for two tracks. Between 132nd and 138th Street, the ramps are largely supported by rectangular concrete piers. The plate girders run parallel to each other, under the tracks, and are intersected perpendicularly by I-beams, which support the concrete-and-ballast trackbeds above. The western ramp crosses over the Port Morris Branch's former eastern pair of tracks from 132nd to 133rd Street and is supported by large steel cross-girders. Between 138th and 142nd streets, the line is carried on an embankment measuring 900 feet (270 m) long.

==== Queens viaduct ====
The Queens approach viaduct descends at a grade of no more than 0.72 percent and is carried over local streets. It ranges from 110 to 30 feet (33.5 to 9.1 m) above ground. The section west of 29th Street measures 2,868 feet (874 m) long and was originally known as the Long Island viaduct. The western viaduct is very similar to those above Randalls and Wards Islands, but the piers of the Queens viaduct use shallow foundations due to the presence of gravel and sand under the viaduct. The gravel and sand could not accommodate loads of more than 3 short tons per square foot (29 t/m^{2}), so the Queens viaduct is supported by especially wide concrete piers.

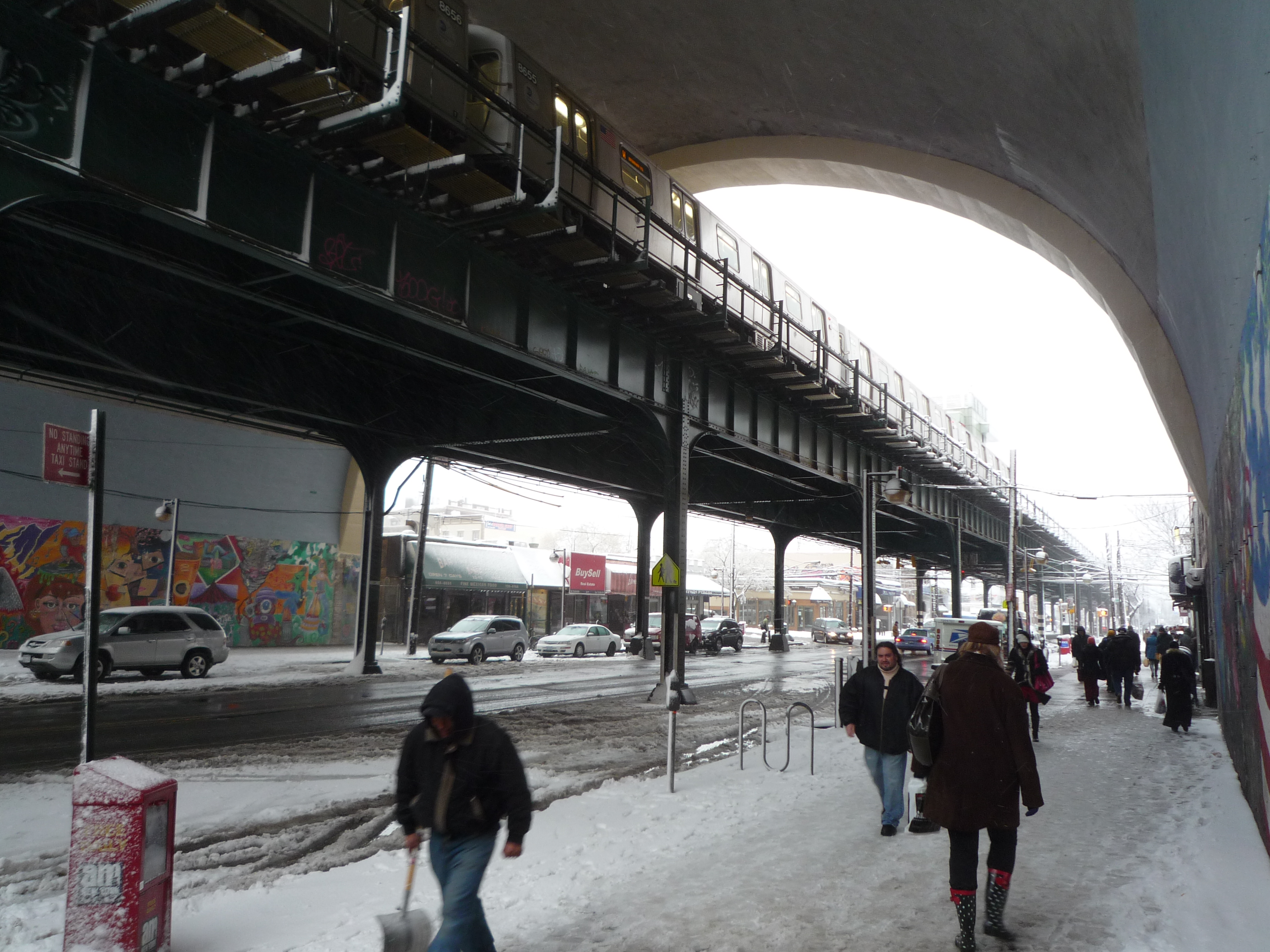
The arch carrying the Hell Gate approach viaduct above the Astoria–Ditmars Boulevard station

The section from 29th to 44th Street (Note: The Railway Age Gazette refers to this segment as running between "Lawrence Street and Stemler Street". These streets have respectively been renamed 29th and 44th streets.) measures 3,480 feet (1,060 m) long and was originally called the eastern viaduct. Reinforced concrete round arches carry the line over several streets in Astoria. The approach viaduct crosses above the New York City Subway's elevated Astoria–Ditmars Boulevard station at 31st Street, and three-centered arches were used at two locations where a flatter arch was required. Warren truss bridges carry the line diagonally above intersections. The truss-bridge segments typically measure 120 to 166 feet (37 to 51 m) long and consist of heavy box-section columns that are made of built-up I-beams. Along the remainder of the eastern viaduct, the tracks run atop compacted land fill, which is enclosed by retaining walls. The retaining walls are made of slabs that are bolted together, while the fill came from the excavation of Sunnyside Yard.

East of 44th Street, the viaduct ends, and the line descends onto an embankment. The passenger and freight tracks branch off in western Queens, past the end of the viaduct.

== Usage ==
The bridge carries two passenger rail tracks, which are part of Amtrak's electrified Northeast Corridor line, and one freight rail track, which is part of the New York Connecting Railroad's Fremont Secondary line. The Northeast Corridor tracks comprise one of Long Island's few railroad connections to the continental U.S. The bridge uses a track gauge of 4 ft 8 1/2 in (1,435 mm), the U.S. standard gauge. The passenger tracks are electrified by overhead wire, and the freight tracks were electrified until 1969. Amtrak owns the bridge.

=== Services ===
==== Passenger rail ====
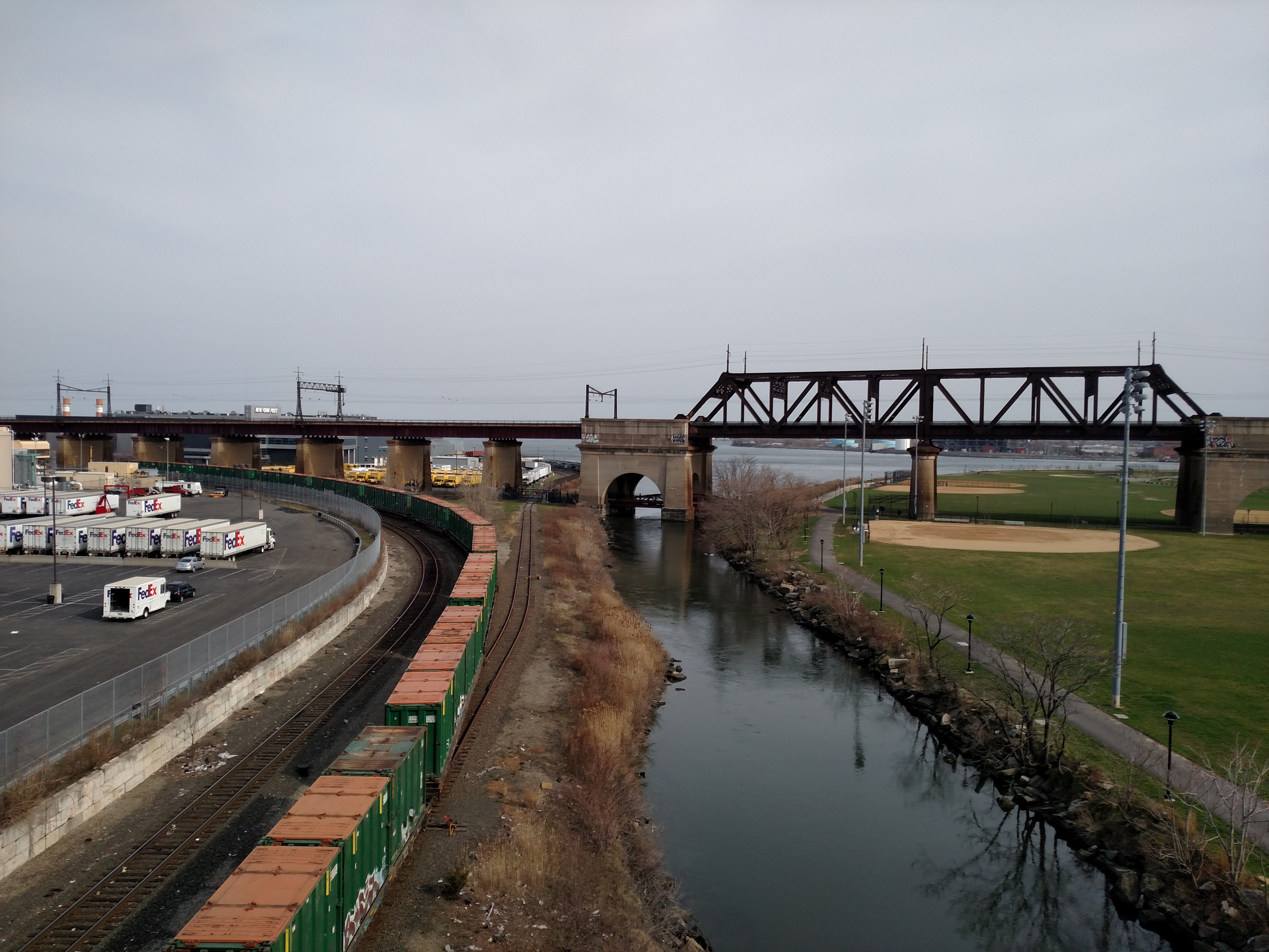
Truss bridge over Bronx Kill

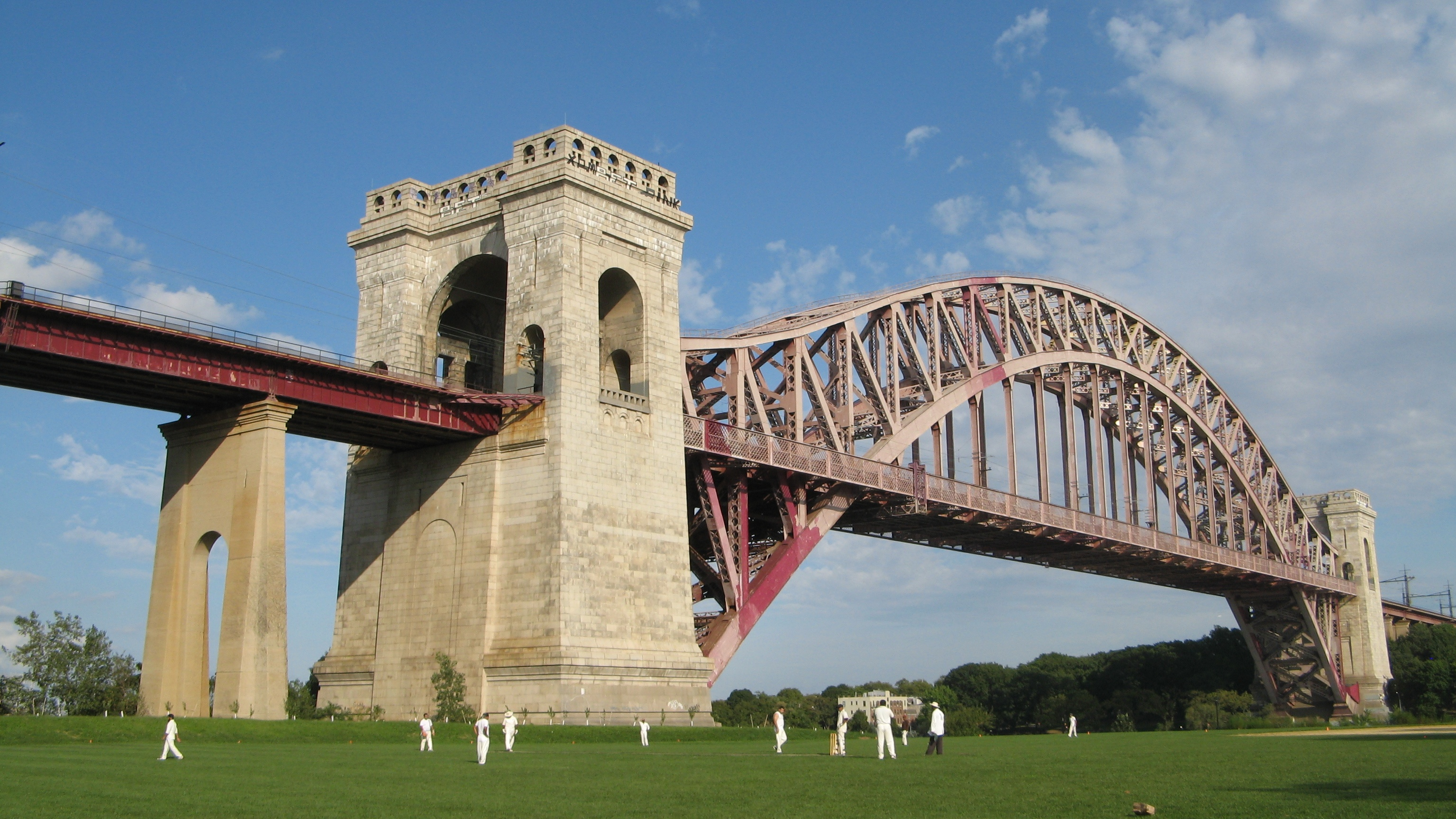
Arch bridge over Hell Gate

The bridge's two western tracks are part of the Hell Gate Line and are used for Acela Express and Northeast Regional service between New York and Boston. The speed limit for passenger trains is 50 miles per hour (80 km/h) on the bridge itself and 60 miles per hour (97 km/h) on the approach viaducts. Past the bridge, the Hell Gate Line continues north to New Rochelle, where it merges with the mainline portion of Metro-North Railroad's New Haven Line, and south to Harold Interlocking, where it merges with the Long Island Rail Road's Main Line. The bridge has traditionally been used by long-distance trains. It has also hosted occasional commuter services, such as special Metro-North services from Connecticut to the Meadowlands station in New Jersey. Before the opening of the Empire Connection in 1991, all Amtrak trains traveling from New York Penn Station to upstate New York and New England had to use the bridge.

In 1962, a regional transportation committee proposed running commuter rail trains from Connecticut to New York Penn Station via the Hell Gate Bridge, in advance of the 1964 New York World's Fair. The proposal was again studied in 1969 and 1973, but the Metropolitan Transportation Authority (MTA) initially dismissed the commuter-rail plan as infeasible. A plan to run some New Haven Line trains over the bridge was again proposed in the 1990s; the main obstacle to the plan was a lack of track space at Penn Station. The MTA studied the plan in 2000s as part of the Penn Station Access project, along with new stations on the Hell Gate Line in the Bronx. Amtrak and the MTA reached an agreement regarding track usage rights in 2019, and construction on Penn Station Access commenced in 2022, after the completion of East Side Access freed up space at Penn Station. As of 2023, New Haven Line trains were expected to begin running to Penn Station in 2028.

There have been proposals for the bridge to carry rapid transit as well. In 1950 and again in 1954, Bronx borough president James J. Lyons proposed running a subway line between Manhattan and the Bronx via the bridge. The Triboro RX subway line, between the Bronx and Brooklyn, was proposed in the 1990s and would have used the Hell Gate Bridge. The Triboro RX plan was scaled down after the MTA determined that it would not be feasible to operate rapid transit on the bridge when Penn Station Access was finished.

==== Freight rail ====
On the eastern side of the bridge is the New York Connecting Railroad's single-track line, which links New York City and Long Island to the North American mainland. The track forms part of the Fremont Secondary. It carries trains of the CSX, Canadian Pacific, and Providence & Worcester railroads from Oak Point Yard in the Bronx to Fresh Pond Yard in Queens, where they connect with the New York and Atlantic Railway to Long Island. Another track was abandoned in the 1970s and totally removed in the late 1990s. The speed limit for freight trains is 10 miles per hour (16 km/h).

=== Electrification ===
As completed, none of the bridge's four tracks had electrification. Although the passenger tracks were electrified by 1918, some steam locomotives continued to travel across the bridge through the 1920s. Freight trains had to switch between electric and steam-powered locomotives at Oak Point Yard. The New York State Legislature passed the Kaufman Act in 1923, mandating the electrification of all railways in New York City, including the freight routes on the Hell Gate Bridge, by January 1, 1926. The freight tracks were still not electrified in late 1925, but the NH was allowed to continue using the bridge and was given until mid-1928 to fully electrify the line. Electric freight service began in July 1927. As a result of electrification, freight trains from Bay Ridge could travel as far east as Cedar Hill Yard in New Haven, Connecticut, without stopping. The freight route was de-electrified in 1969, and the overhead wire above the freight tracks was removed.

The passenger tracks were originally electrified using a 11 kV, 25 Hz overhead catenary traction power system, as they were part of the NH's electrification system. Freight trains used the same 11 kV, 25 Hz traction power system when the freight tracks were electrified. After Amtrak took over the Northeast Corridor in the 1970s, it announced plans to upgrade the line to a 25 kV, 60 Hz traction power system. Ultimately, the section of track over the Hell Gate Bridge was upgraded to 12.5 kV, 60 Hz electric traction. Just south of the bridge's Queens terminus, the Hell Gate Line transitions to Amtrak's 12 kV, 25 Hz traction power system, as that part of the route was electrified by the PRR.

While NH trains were capable of operating on third rail power through the East River Tunnels to Penn Station, there was no third rail on the bridge. Overhead catenary poles are instead installed along the length of the Hell Gate Bridge. Power is supplied by substations along the Hell Gate Line. During the winter, the catenary wires could be defrosted by increasing the current coming from the substations.

=== Fees and surcharges ===
Fees were originally charged on freight trains that used the Hell Gate Bridge. For instance, in the 1910s, the New Haven Railroad charged a fee of three cents for every 100 pounds (45 kg) of cargo that was transported via the bridge, a fee that was raised to five cents after World War I.

During World War I, passengers began paying a fee on trips that used the bridge. The surcharge, imposed on all passengers who were not departing or arriving at New York Penn Station, was originally 75 cents but was raised to 90 cents in 1920. To avoid the surcharge, passengers transiting through New York City frequently chose to buy a ticket from their original departure point to Penn Station, then another from Penn Station to their destination. This prompted a complaint in 1945, in which a traveler claimed that the fee was discriminatory; an ICC examiner recommended that the PRR and NH stop charging the fee, but the ICC rejected the recommendation. The ICC launched another inquiry into the surcharge in 1951. ICC commissioner J. Monroe Johnson recommended in 1954 that the surcharge either be applied to all rail trips or be abolished entirely, but the ICC also rejected the proposal.

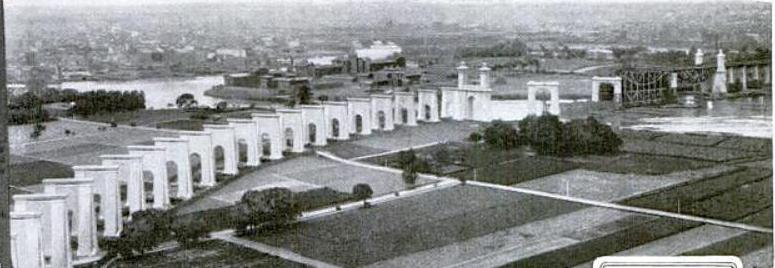
The Wards Island viaduct under construction c. 1915, looking north from the Hell Gate arch toward the Little Hell Gate span

== Impact ==
=== Critical reception ===
When the bridge was being built, The New York Times wrote that the bridge's abutments would dwarf the buildings on Wards Islands but that "it will give the idea of lightness and symmetry as well as almost immovable strength". Hornbostel said the main span would "form a veritable triumphal arch at the northerly entrance of the Port of New York", while the Railway Gazette called the project "second in interest only to the Quebec Bridge" due to its length. After the main arch was completed, a writer for the New-York Tribune said: "Perhaps never in human history has a mechanical triumph of such magnitude been launched with so little fanfare", while Outlook magazine described it as being "of interest in both the scientific world and in the world of transportation". A writer for The American Architect magazine said in 1920 that "there is something picturesque about the long viaduct leading to Hell Gate Bridge".

A 1972 almanac described the Hell Gate Bridge as one of 84 "notable modern bridges" across the world. Jeffrey Kroessler and Nina Rappaport, the authors of the 1990 book Historic Preservation in Queens, described the Hell Gate Bridge as one of 35 structures in Queens that they believed were worth designating as official New York City landmarks. At the end of the 20th century, the Engineering News-Record wrote that, "Its name notwithstanding, Hell Gate Bridge over the East River in New York City is considered to be one of the world's most beautiful bridges."

In 2004, Joe Greenstein of Trains magazine described Amtrak passengers' view from the bridge as the "spectacular reward for enduring the cramped chaos of Penn Station", but that the bridge was rarely noticed by those on the ground. Nicholas underhill, bridge enthusiast and writer for the same magazine, called the Hell Gate Bridge "one of the most impressive and important railroad structures in America" in 2007. At the bridge's centennial, Greater Astoria Historical Society director Bob Singleton called the Hell Gate Bridge "a school for 20th-century bridge making" and attributed the bridge's relative obscurity to the fact that it did not accommodate vehicles or pedestrians. According to Amtrak's deputy chief structural engineer, Jim Richter, the bridge was "a great symbol of the railroad".

=== Effect on development and commerce ===
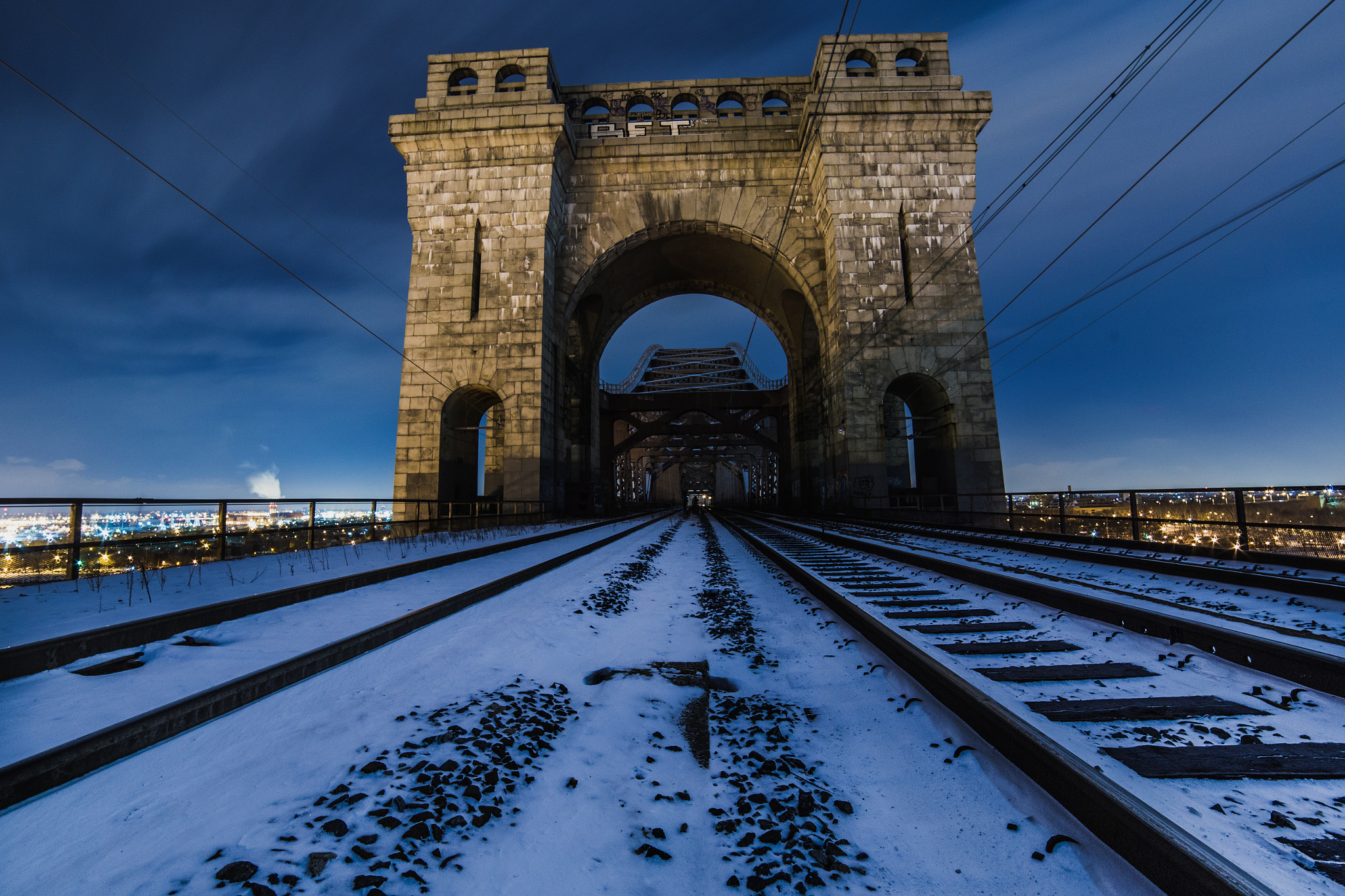
The main span's deck

When the Hell Gate Bridge and the NYCR line were proposed, the Brooklyn Times reported that the bridge and line would shift New York City's freight rail traffic from Manhattan to Brooklyn, and PRR president Alexander Cassatt said the project would be second only to the Panama Canal in its impact on trade. The bridge would also enable residents of towns along the New Haven railroad to commute to Penn Station, at a time when the railroad used Grand Central Terminal to access Manhattan. The New-York Tribune wrote in 1908 that, "for the first time in the history of this city, [there will be] an all-rail route through New York between New England and the South". After work had begun, The New York Times called the bridge and the NYCR line "one of the greatest improvements under way toward the industrial development of Queens", while the Sun said the bridge would increase Long Island's population and economy by making Queens into an industrial hub. The Times also predicted in 1913 that the bridge's completion would increase real-estate values in western Queens and the South Bronx.

When the bridge was completed, various houses and other buildings were constructed underneath the bridge's approach viaduct, particularly in Queens. The Brooklyn Daily Eagle predicted that the completion of the bridge, along with the proposed Cross-Harbor Rail Tunnel, would reduce shipping times to and from Brooklyn by a full day. The Railway Age Gazette similarly predicted that freight rail would benefit most from the Hell Gate Bridge. When the bridge opened, business owners negotiated for space near LIRR yards in western Queens, owing to these yards' proximity to the bridge.

=== Influence and media ===
Railway Age wrote in 1955 that the Hell Gate Bridge had signified "the advent of steel arch construction" for railroad bridges. Its design influenced the designs of others around the world. The Sydney Harbour Bridge in Sydney, Australia, was heavily influenced by the Hell Gate Bridge. The engineer in charge of the Sydney Harbour Bridge, John Bradfield, had surveyed the Hell Gate Bridge while trying to come up with designs for the Sydney crossing. The design of the Tyne Bridge in Newcastle upon Tyne, England, was also derived from the Hell Gate Bridge. The McKees Rocks Bridge near Pittsburgh, Pennsylvania, was also modeled on the Hell Gate Bridge.

When the bridge was completed, the architect Hugh Ferriss drew a cover for the Queens Chamber of Commerce's monthly magazine Queensborough, which depicted the main span. The main span was depicted in movies such as the 1973 film Serpico and the 1991 film Queens Logic, as well as TV shows such as Orange Is the New Black. The bridge's name inspired the name of the 2000 film Under Hellgate Bridge by Michael Sergio. In addition, the bridge has inspired works of art such as Hell Gate, a 28-foot-long (8.5 m) model of the main span by the artist Chris Burden. The New York Botanical Garden's annual Christmas train show also includes a replica of the Hell Gate Bridge. The cooperatively-owned local news site Hell Gate NYC takes its name and visual identity from the bridge.

== See also ==
- List of bridges and tunnels in New York City
- List of bridges documented by the Historic American Engineering Record in New York
- Rail freight transportation in New York City and Long Island
