= Grain Belt Beer Sign =

Historic sign in Minneapolis

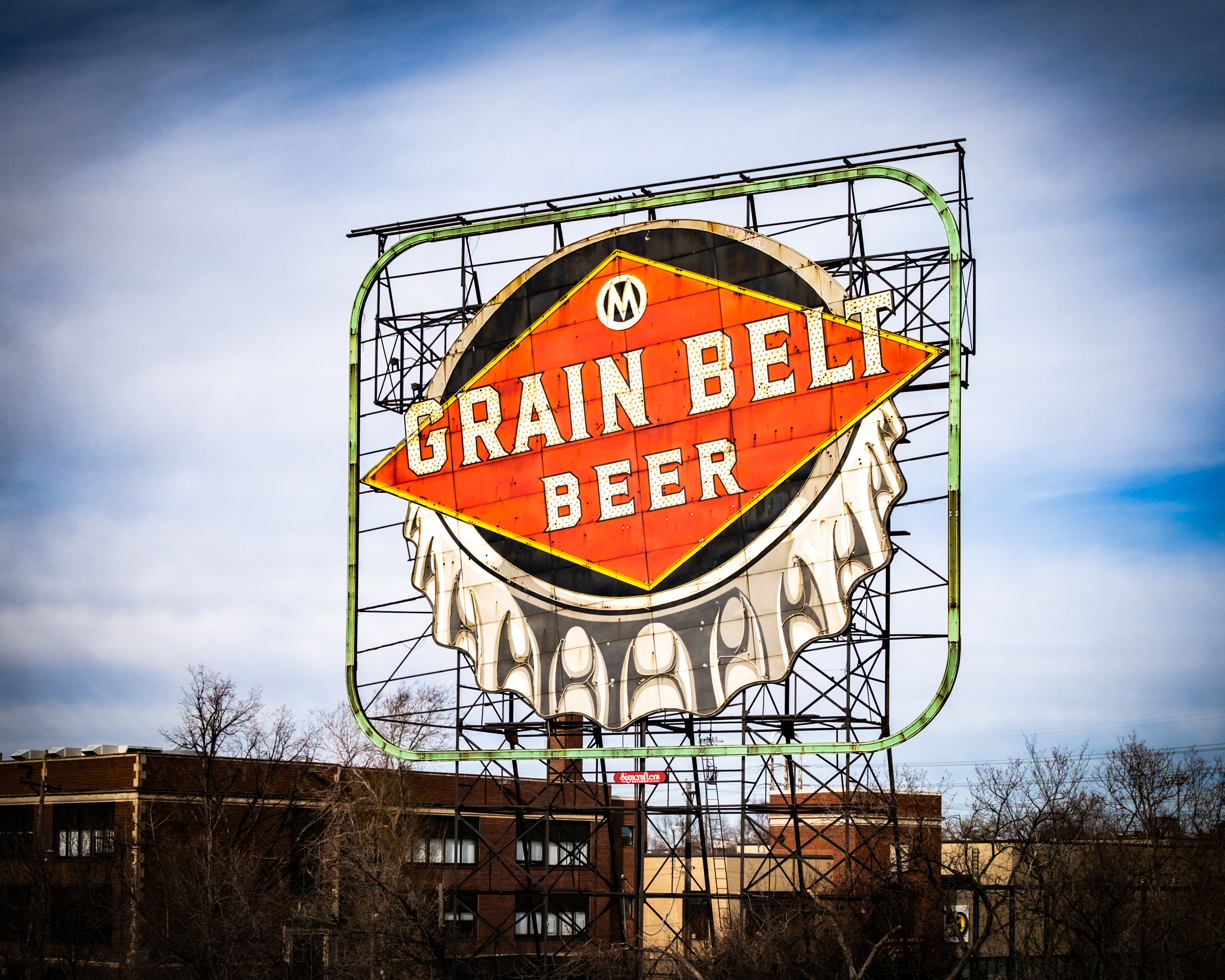
- Grain Belt Beer Sign with DeLaSalle High School in the background
- Interactive map of the Grain Belt Beer Sign area

General information
- Type: Sign
- Location: Nicollet Island, 4 Island Avenue W., Minneapolis, United States
- Coordinates: 44.9861°N 93.2634°W
- Completed: 1941; 85 years ago
- Relocated: 1950
- Renovated: 2017
- Cost: $5,000 ($109,446 in 2025)
- Owner: August Schell Brewing Company

Technical details
- Size: 51 ft (15.5 m) tall; 63 ft (19.2 m) wide

Design and construction
- Architect: General Outdoor Advertising Company
- Grain Belt Beer Sign
- U.S. National Register of Historic Places
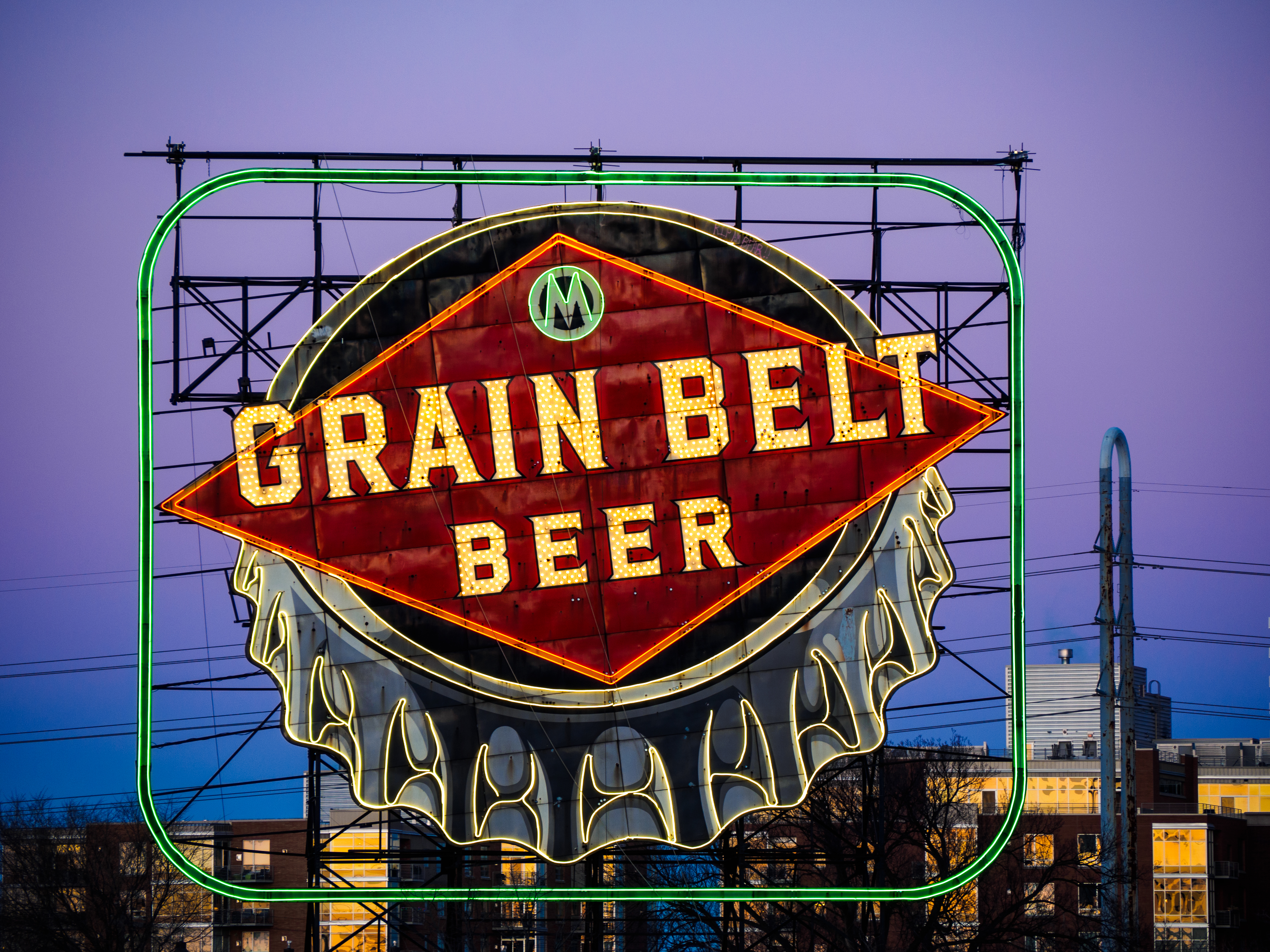
- The sign at twilight
- NRHP reference No.: 16000511
- Added to NRHP: August 4, 2016

The Grain Belt Beer Sign is a historic sign on Nicollet Island in Minneapolis, Minnesota, United States. It was originally built as a neon sign displaying a bottle cap of Grain Belt beer for the Marigold Ballroom in 1941. At the time of its construction, it was one of the largest neon signs in the United States. In 1950, it was moved to its current location on Nicollet Island. After the Grain Belt brewery closed in the 1970s, the sign fell into disuse and disrepair. An effort to renovate and remodel the sign took place in the 2010s, with the sign undergoing conversion from neon to LEDs in 2017. It was added to the National Register of Historic Places in 2016.

== History ==
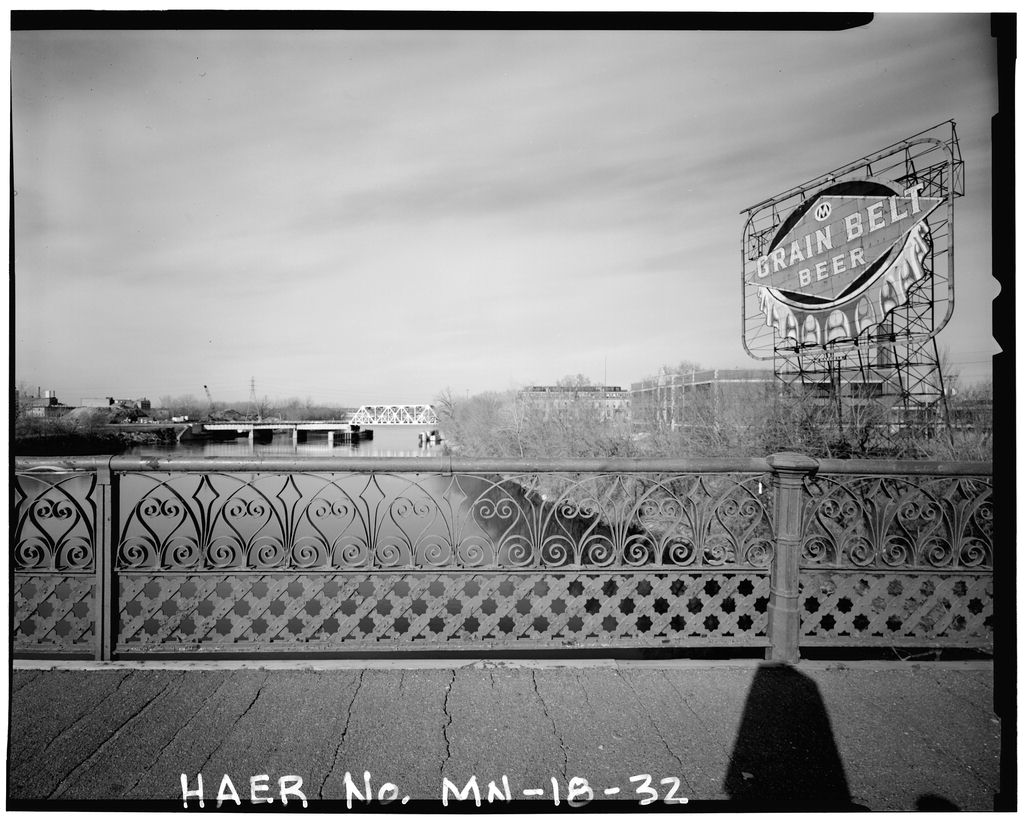
The Minneapolis Steel Arch Bridge, or Hennepin Avenue Bridge, photographed for the Historic American Building Survey in 1986.

Seeking to put itself in a strong position following the lifting of Prohibition, the Minneapolis Brewing Company erected several Grain Belt beer signs around Minneapolis by 1938, including one at the Marigold Ballroom and another at 101 East Hennepin Avenue. The current sign with the bottlecap design was built in 1941 by the General Outdoor Advertising Company for $5,000 ($109,446 in 2025). It replaced the old sign on the Marigold Ballroom, and was erected in April 1941. The 100-foot-tall (30 m) structure features a bottlecap with the Grain Belt Beer logo in the shape of a diamond inside. The top of the 52-foot-tall (16 m), 63-foot-wide (19 m) sign features a letter "M" inside a circle, representing the Minneapolis Brewing Company. At the time of its construction, it was one of the largest neon signs in the United States. The sign was removed in March 1950 and was moved to its current location on Nicollet Island in June of the same year. Located next to the Hennepin Avenue Bridge, the sign commanded a strong presence and was difficult to miss for those leaving downtown towards the east.

The neon sign would sequentially light each letter of "Grain Belt Beer". After 1975, when the Grain Belt brewery closed, the sign was lit only on occasion. The sign received a $125,000 renovation in 1989 and was ceremonially relit, but was darkened again in 1991 after the cost of lighting became prohibitive. It was briefly illuminated by a spotlight to promote Grain Belt Nordeast beer on April 14, 2010. Winthrop Eastman, owner of the sign, said he longed for it to be permanently relit; however, practicalities of refurbishing thousands of feet of neon tubes and more than 1,000 incandescent bulbs created roadblocks. Political obstacles involving area residents also complicated the issue.

New life for the sign began in 2014, when August Schell Brewing Company entered talks to purchase the sign. The company had acquired the Grain Belt brand in 2002, but the sign had not been included. Schell's purchased the sign in 2016, with hopes to have the sign relit by 2017. The sign's porcelain facade needed cleaning, and graffiti had to be removed from its reverse side. Its neon tubes and incandescent bulbs were replaced with LEDs. While it used to cost $4,000 a month ($48,000 annually) to illuminate the sign, with the new lighting, only $7,500 per year was projected. On December 30, 2017, the sign was relit in time for Super Bowl LII. The purchase and renovations combined cost Schell's about $500,000 ($656,734 in 2025).

The sign was added to the National Register of Historic Places on August 4, 2016. It is one of only a few outdoor signs remaining from the twentieth century along the Minneapolis riverfront.
