= Hennepin Avenue Bridge (1888) =

Former bridge in Minnesota

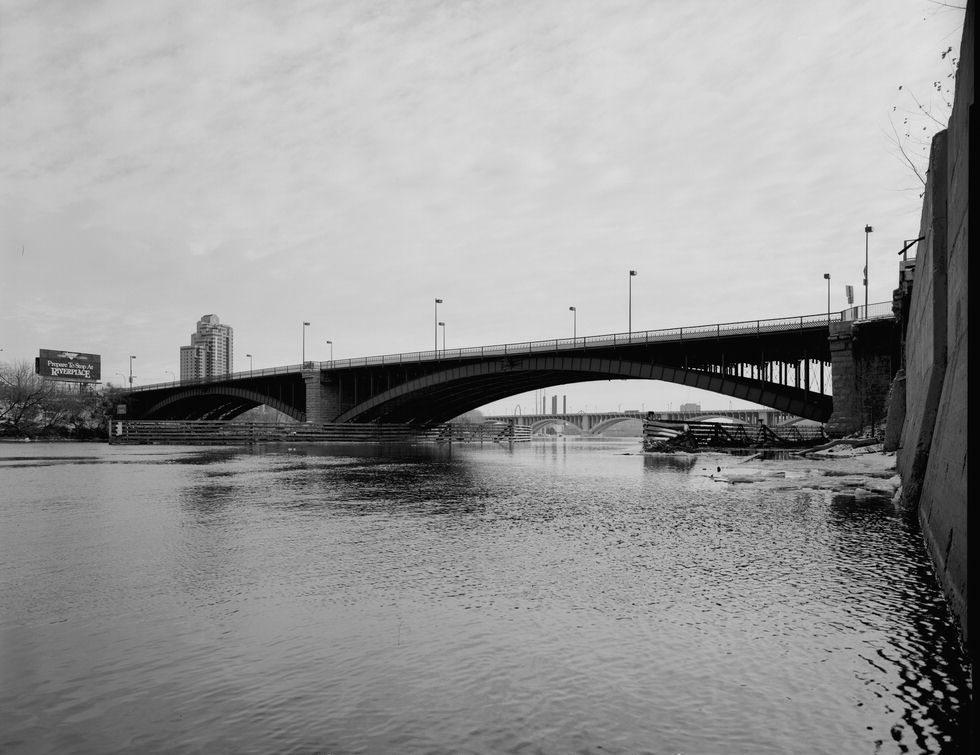
- The bridge from the northwest
- Coordinates: 44°59′07″N 93°15′50″W
- Crossed: Mississippi River
- Locale: Minneapolis, Minnesota, US
- Official name: Steel Arch Bridge

Characteristics
- Width: 56 feet (roadway); 12 feet (sidewalks)

History
- Designer: Andrew Rinker; Frederick William Cappelen
- Constructed by: Keystone Bridge Company (northern section); Wrought Iron Bridge Company (southern section)
- Construction cost: $266,365 ($9.54 million in 2025)
- Opened: 1888 (northern section); 1891 (southern section)
- Demolished: 1988 (northern section); 1989 (southern section)
- Replaced by: Hennepin Avenue Bridge
- Hennepin Avenue Steel Arch Bridge
- U.S. Historic district – Contributing property
- Location within Minnesota Location within the United States
- Location: Minneapolis, Minnesota
- Part of: St. Anthony Falls Historic District (ID71000438)
- Designated CP: March 11, 1971

Location
- Interactive map of Hennepin Avenue Bridge

The Hennepin Avenue Bridge, or the Steel Arch Bridge, was a hinged arch bridge crossing the Mississippi River at Hennepin Avenue from the west bank of Minneapolis, Minnesota, United States, to Nicollet Island. While described and named as a single bridge the upriver and downstream sides were designed and built separately. It replaced a 1876 suspension bridge, which in turn replaced an 1855 suspension bridge which had been the first span to cross the Mississippi. The northernmost section was built in 1888 and the southern section was built in 1891. After receiving renovations in 1897, 1931, and 1954, the bridge's northern and southern sections were demolished and replaced in 1988 and 1989, respectively, as they were replaced by the current Hennepin Avenue Bridge.

== Description ==
The bridge, a century old at its demolition, had been designed and constructed in two linear halves. The northern, upstream half was built first. It was a two-span triple two-hinged arch design; that is, this half of the bridge was supported in the center by pier, on either side of which three steel arches reached to the shore abutments. These arches were each made with pinned, rotating connections at the bases only. Because of unwanted “jiggling” movement, the southern downstream half was built with three-hinged arches, with rotating pinned hinges at the crown as well as the base. The bridge had special historic significance to engineering as the two sections were built by different companies in different styles. The final modern corrugated steel deck gave a tenor hum as vehicles drove across.

== History ==
=== Background ===
The population of Minneapolis greatly expanded from 47,000 in 1880 to 185,000 in 1890. By 1884, it had become clear that the 1876 suspension bridge was no longer sufficient. Hennepin County authorized funding for an 80-foot (24 m)-wide stone arch bridge. However, there was opposition to this proposal; by milling companies because of the three piers that would be required and a possible reduction in power output from the river, and also from others who wanted to preserve the "beautiful" previous bridge. Despite the opposition, construction began in December 1885 but an injunction was obtained by a milling company to halt work in January 1886. A reevaluation by engineers recommended a steel arch bridge with a single pier. As an added benefit, this structure would also be cheaper. The dual steel arch bridge was designed by Andrew Rinker, the Minneapolis city engineer, and Frederick William Cappelen.

=== Construction ===
The bridge's northern bridge was built by the Keystone Bridge Company of Pittsburgh, and the $187,613 ($6.72 million in 2025) bridge became open for travel on June 3, 1888. For some time, the new steel arch bridge and the old suspension bridge stood side-by-side. The new steel arch bridge and the previous suspension bridge stood side-by-side until it became clear the suspension bridge was no longer structurally sound. At that time, bids were accepted for a second, southern section. The second bridge was built by Wrought Iron Bridge Company of Canton, Ohio, and was substantially completed by January 1891. The total cost of the bridges was $266,365 ($9.54 million in 2025). Each section consisted of two 280-ft, three-rib spans. The roadway was 56 feet wide, with 12 feet for sidewalks.

=== Renovations ===
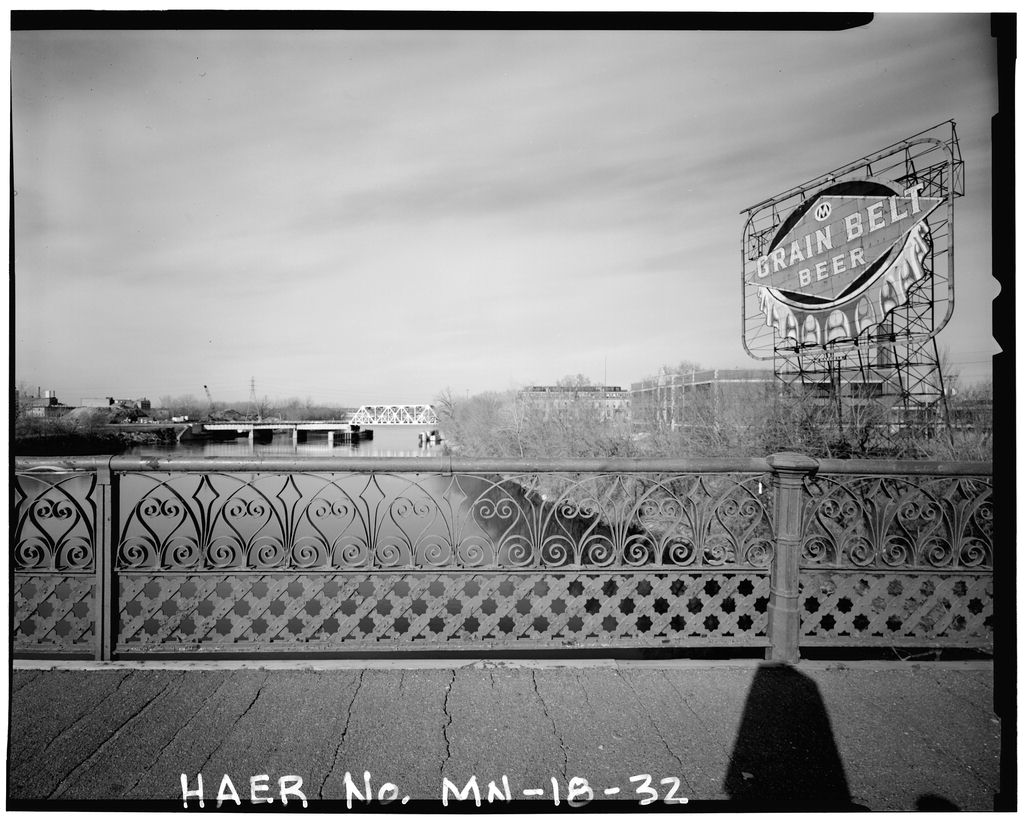
The railing of the bridge looking towards the Grain Belt Beer Sign

The bridge received three major renovations over the course of its life. The first was in 1897, installing buckle plates and repaving the northern half of the bridge. In 1931, the brick paving was replaced by timber overlaid with asphalt. A 1954 renovation removed the timber deck and replaced it with an open mesh steel I-beam deck, and at the same time added concrete curbing, new guard rails, and new lamp posts.

=== End of life ===
In 1971, the bridge was added to the National Register of Historic Places as a contributing property of the St. Anthony Falls Historic District.

By 1982, Hennepin County had begun looking into replacing the at the time 94-year-old bridge. Without major renovations or replacement the county estimated the bridge would only last another five years. with over 20,000 vehicle crossings every day, the bridge was showing an inability to keep up with the load of modern traffic. While in good condition, the aging bridge was determined to need around $10 million ($26 million in 2025) in remodeling costs. However, county officials required that the bridge be able to carry six lanes of traffic with the potential to accommodate light rail lines, which scuttled plans to renovate rather than rebuild the bridge.

The year 1987 saw Congress pass the Surface Transportation and Uniform Relocation Assistance Act, which required states to inventory historic bridges and attempt to rehabilitate or relocate qualifying bridges before demolition. Following a call from a government bureaucrat informing him of the requirement, Ted Hoffman, the chief design engineer of Hennepin County, advertised the bridge as for sale in January 1988. Hoffman expressed incredulity at the concept, stating that he couldn't "imagine someone going to that expense". By July the bridge began to be gradually disassembled, one hundred years after its completion. (Note: It does not appear that a sale went through. Contemporary reporting suggests mockery at the idea, both for the Hennepin bridge and others.) The northern half was torn down in 1988, and the southern half in 1989 after the northern half of the new bridge opened.

== See also ==
- Media related to Hennepin Avenue Bridge (1888) at Wikimedia Commons
- Grain Belt Beer Sign
- List of bridges documented by the Historic American Engineering Record in Minnesota
- List of crossings of the Upper Mississippi River
