= Hinged arch bridge =

Arch bridge with hinges to allow movement

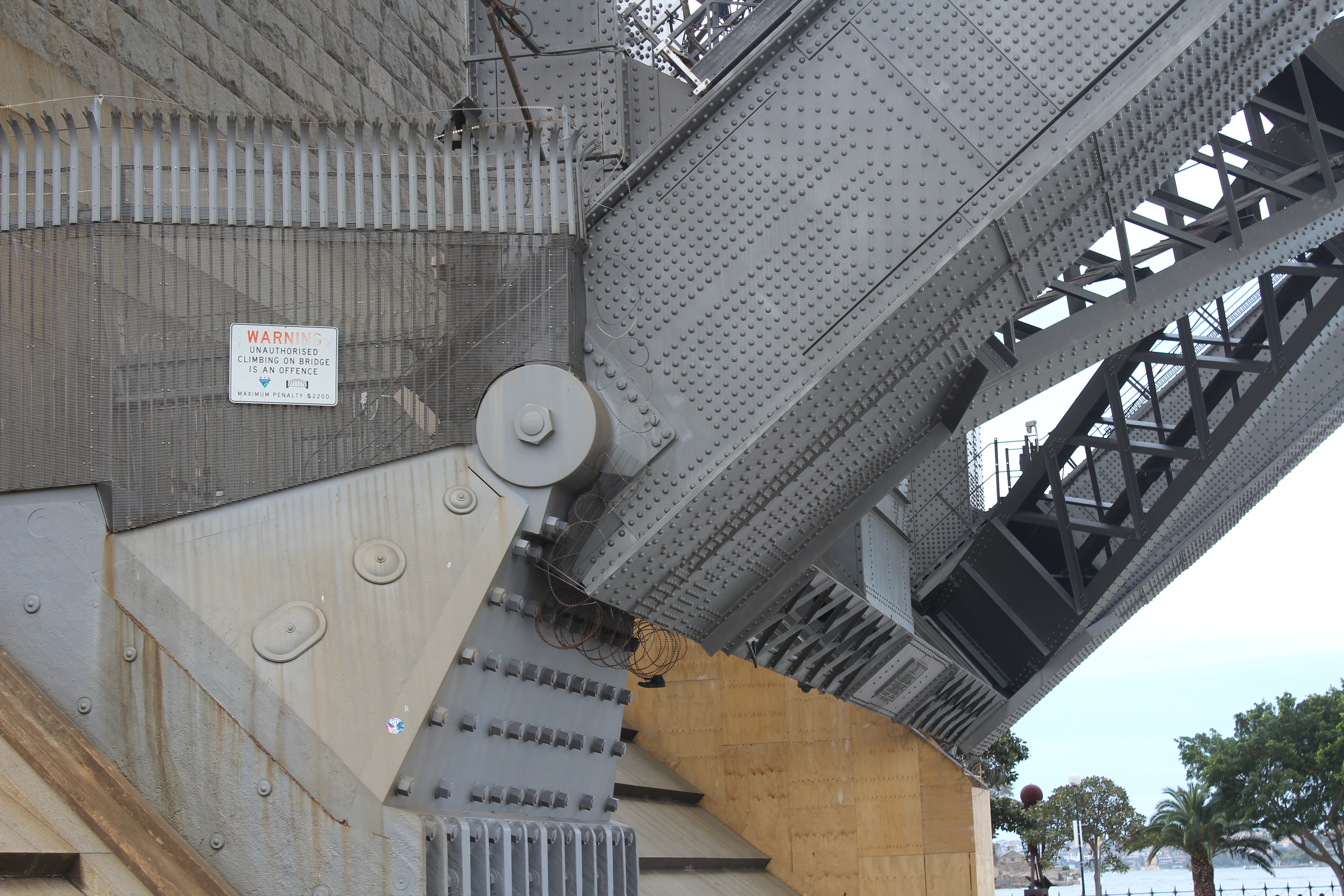
Hinges at one of the springing points of the Sydney Harbour Bridge, a two-hinged 504-metre-long (1,654 ft) bridge built in 1925.

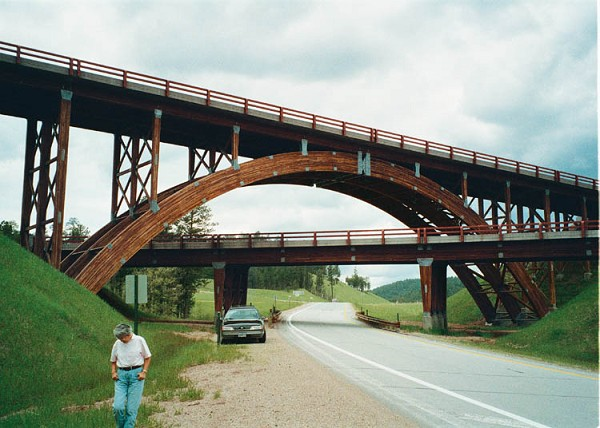
Glue-laminated timber arch bridge with a visible central hinge

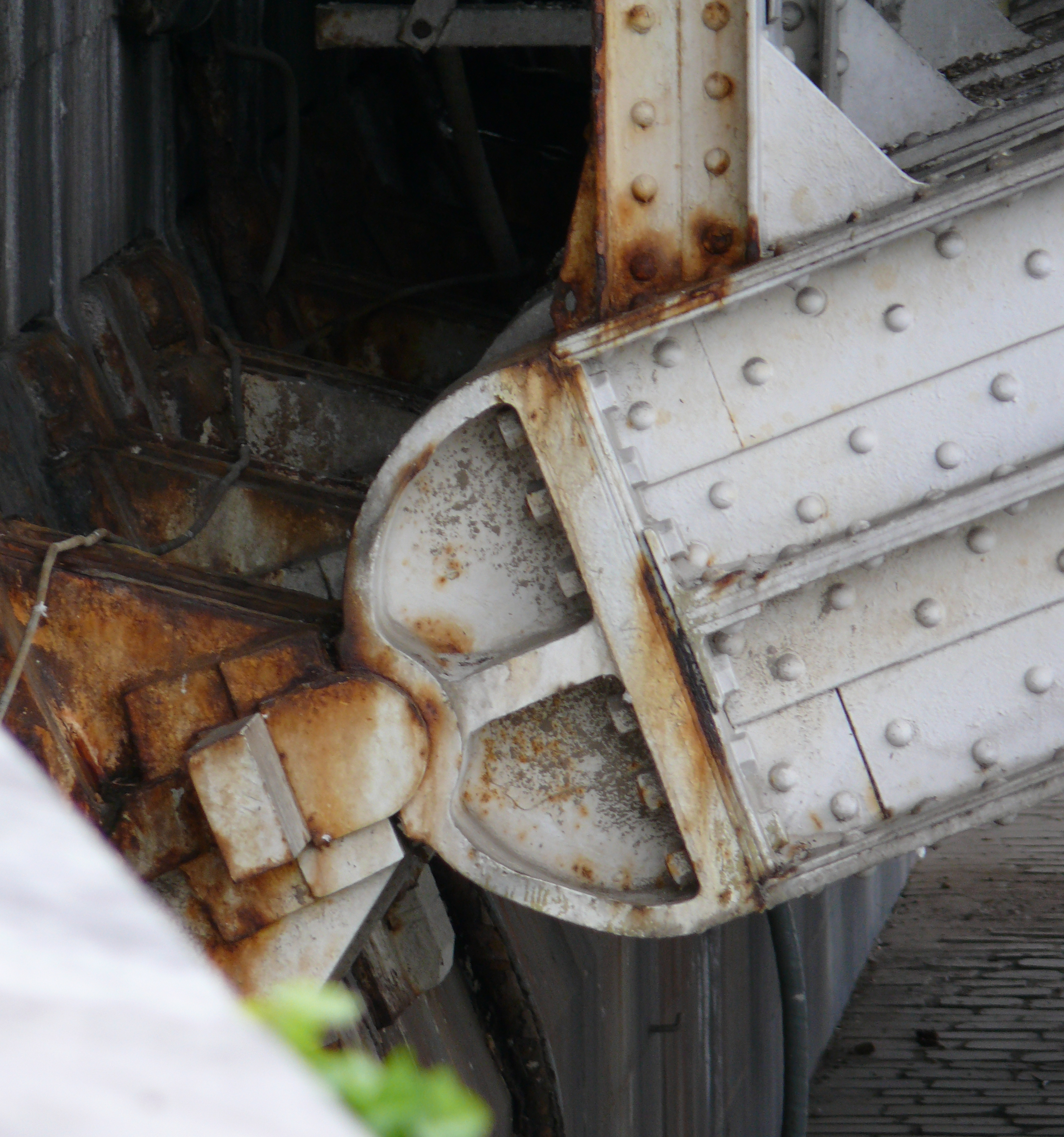
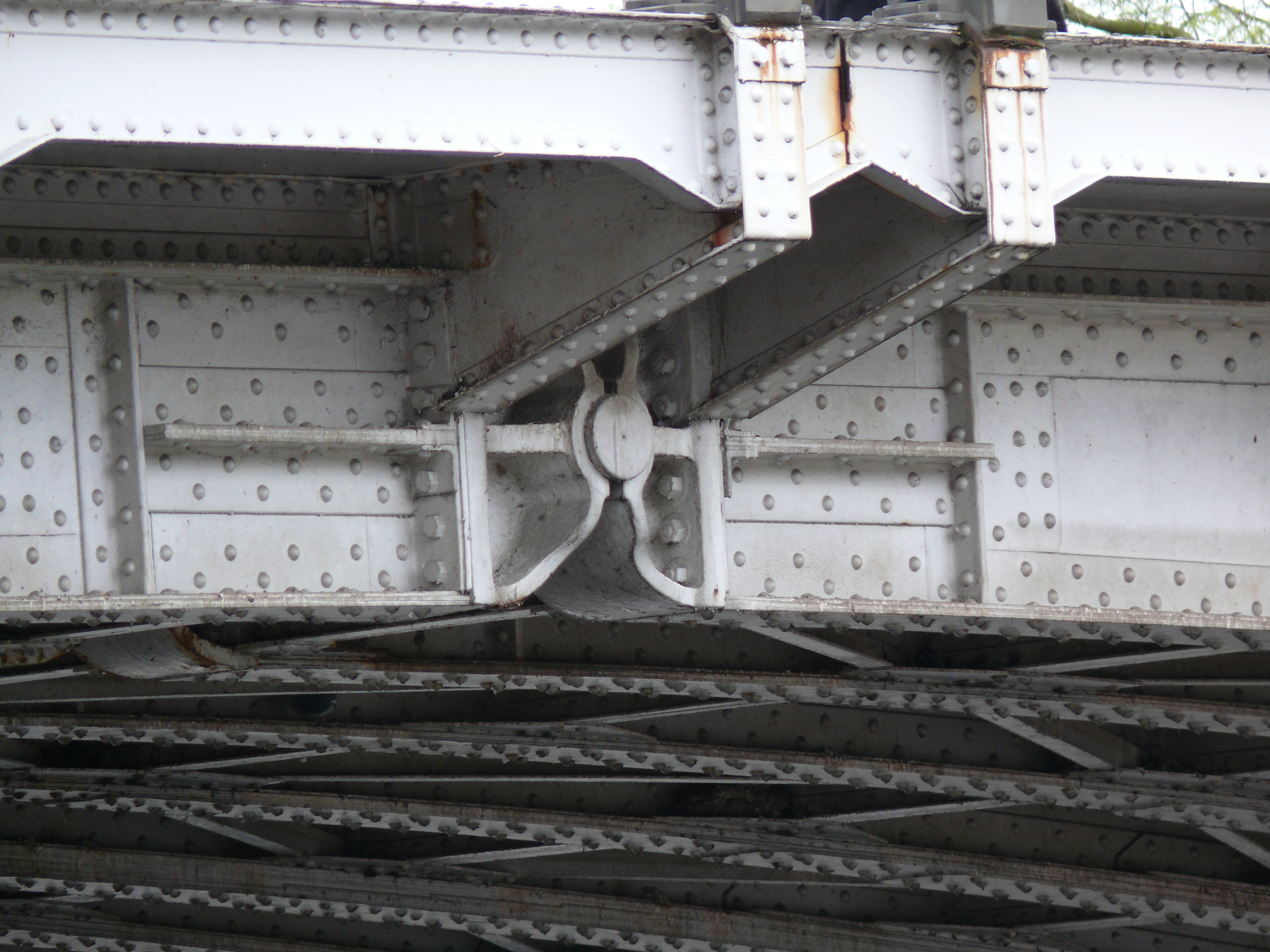
Springing point hinge (left) and crown hinge (right) on a three-hinged arch bridge in Namur, Belgium

A hinged arch bridge is one with hinges incorporated into its structure to allow movement. In structural engineering, a hinge is essentially a "cut in the structure" that can withstand compressive forces. In a steel arch, the hinge allows free rotation, somewhat resembling a common hinge. The most common hinged arch bridge varieties are the two-hinged bridge with hinges at the springing points and the three-hinged bridge with an additional hinge at the crown of the arch; though single-hinged versions exist with a hinge only at the crown of the arch. Hinges at the springing point prevent bending moments from being transferred to the bridge abutments. A triple-hinged bridge is statically determinate, while the other versions are not.

== Description ==
A fixed arch bridge, that is one without hinges, exerts a bending moment at the abutments and stresses caused by changes of temperature or shrinkage of concrete have to be taken up by the arch. A two-hinged arch has a hinge at the base of each arch (the springing point), while a three-hinged arch has a third hinge at the crown of the arch. The advantage of the fixed arches is in their lower construction and maintenance costs.

In a two-hinged arch bridge, no bending moments are transferred to the abutments, due to the presence of the hinge. A change in the relative position of the abutments may cause a change in the thrust load exerted by the arch on the abutments. The addition of a third hinge at the crown, which allows rotation of the arch members, means that the thrust and shear forces exerted on the abutments are not affected by small movements in either abutment. Three-hinged arch bridges are, therefore, used when there is the possibility of unequal settlement of the abutments. Single-hinged arch bridges, with a hinge only at the crown, were also built though in relatively small numbers compared to the other types.

A three-hinged bridge is isostatic, that is it is statically determinate; a two-hinged bridge is statically indeterminate in one degree of freedom, while a fixed arch bridge is indeterminate in three degrees of freedom. The statically determinate three-hinged arches were popular until the Second World War. Post-war, the advances in calculation methods allowed the broad use of statically indeterminate schemes. At the end of the 20th century, three-hinged arches made a comeback associated with the uses of engineered wood ("glulam") in bridge construction: the glulam construction has to be pre-fabricated, using three-hinged design naturally divides the arch into two halves that are easier to transport.

While in steel arches hinges typically allow free rotation of connected parts, in reinforced concrete bridges typical implementation of a hinge involves thinning of the concrete structure while adding more reinforcement locally.

== History ==
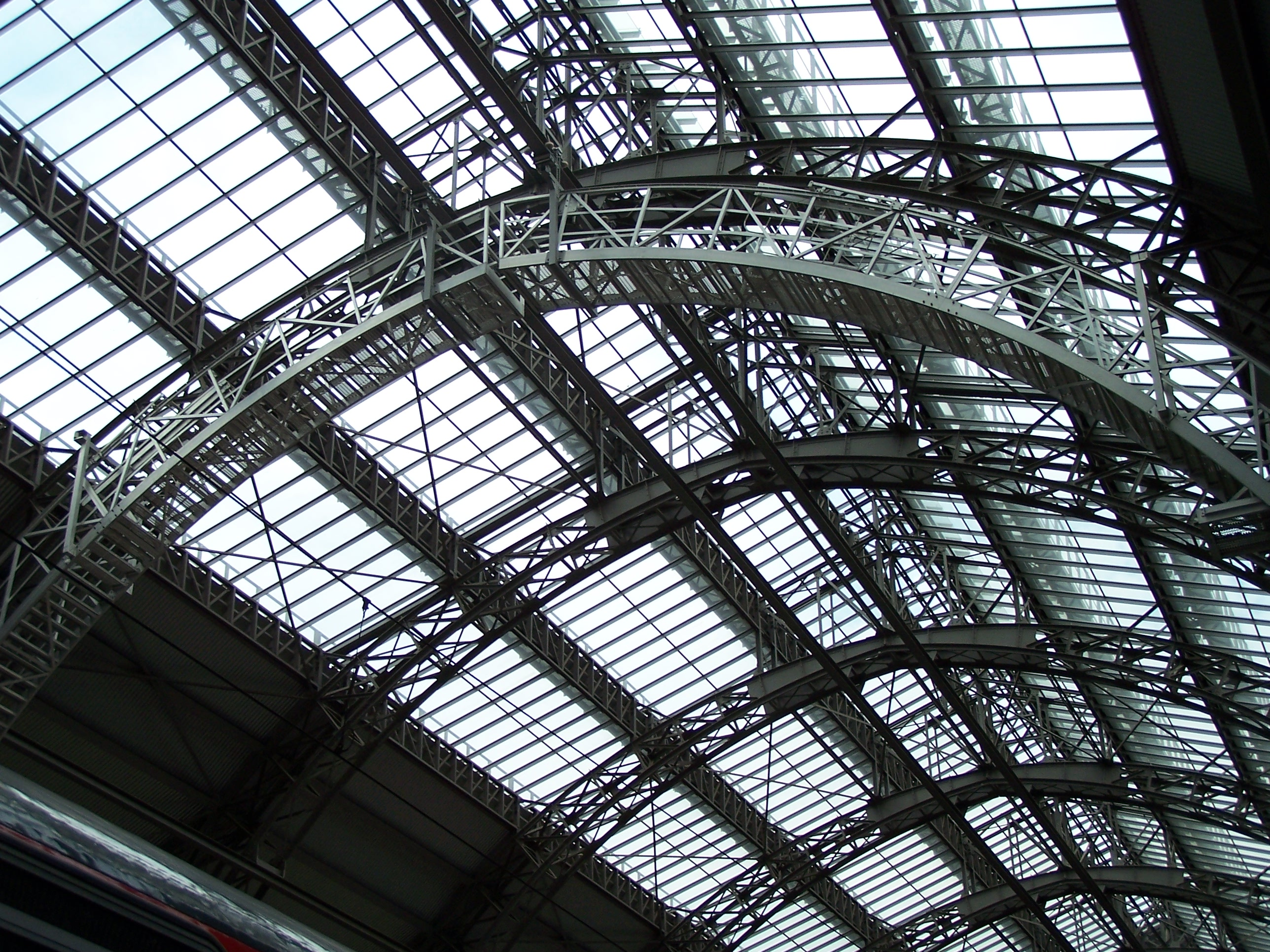
An early example of the three-hinged design (c. 1885, Frankfurt (Main) Hauptbahnhof)

Early arch bridges were fixed arches. The two-hinged bridge was developed by the engineers Couche and Salle in 1858 for a wrought iron bridge carrying the Paris-Creil railway line across the Canal Saint-Denis. They had attempted to introduce a third hinge at the crown but were unsuccessful because the thickness of the arch was insufficient. The first three-hinged bridge was the Unterspree Bridge in Berlin (Johann Wilhelm Schwedler, 1863), built two years after the pioneering theoretical work by Claus Koepcke. Hradecky Bridge (1866) is probably the oldest three-hinged bridge still used.

Hinged bridges were popular with railway companies, who often needed to construct large bridges. The Arch Bridge at Bellows Falls in New England, built in 1905, is a particularly large example of a three-hinged arch bridge. At 540 feet (160 m) in length, it was the longest in America when built. The 1888 Hennepin Avenue Bridge in Minneapolis was unusual in that it was both a two- and three-hinged bridge. The bridge was split longitudinally with the two halves being built by different companies. The north arch ribs are three-hinged, while the south arch ribs are two-hinged. Three-hinged arch bridges remain popular in modern civil engineering.

== Sources ==
- Slivnik, L. (2013-06-27). "Three–hinged structures in a historical perspective". Structures and Architecture. CRC Press. pp. 1088–1095. doi:10.1201/b15267-153. ISBN 978-0-429-15935-0.
