= List of railroad yards in New York City =

Passenger and freight facilities within city limits

New York City is extensively served by passenger railroads, with limited facilities available for freight railroads. Amtrak, Long Island Rail Road and Metro-North Railroad all own and operate passenger yards in New York City. There are also many yards operated by the New York City Subway system. See List of New York City Subway yards.

CSX Transportation and New York & Atlantic Railway own and operate freight yards in the city. Furthermore, there are rail yards on property owned by the city of New York, but leased to freight railroads including New York New Jersey Rail. See Rail freight transportation in New York City and Long Island.

== Manhattan ==
- West Side Yard - A coach yard owned and operated by the Long Island Rail Road. Built in the 1980s between 31st and 33rd St on the site of a New York Central freight yard, it is the only active railroad yard in Manhattan, excluding the subway system.

== Queens ==
- Sunnyside Yard - The largest railroad yard in New York City. It is owned and operated by Amtrak, but also used by NJ Transit. Now a passenger coach yard, it formerly also had a freight section (LIRR "Yard A") that was closed to make room for the East Side Access project.
- Fresh Pond Junction - The primary freight yard on Long Island, operated by the New York & Atlantic Railway
- Hillside Facility - Owned and operated by the LIRR.
- Morris Park Facility - Owned and operated by the LIRR.
- Glendale Yard - Owned by the LIRR, operated by the New York & Atlantic Railway.
- Arch Street Yard- Owned by the LIRR but which services both LIRR and Metro-North equipment. Also has a freight terminal for New York & Atlantic Railway.
- Bayside Yard - Small LIRR maintenance yard usually used to stage equipment and supplies for track work. Located at 40-30 219th St, Flushing, NY 11361

== Brooklyn ==
- Bush Terminal – Yard for freight traveling by car float across New York Harbor via New York New Jersey Rail, LLC. As of July 2012, the yard is no longer in service and the car float has been transferred to 65th Street Yard.
- 65th Street Yard – Rebuilt by the City of New York Economic Development Corp. It was operated by NY&A, but the transfer bridges were unused. In July 2012, operation of the yard was leased to NYNJ Rail, and transfer bridges were placed in service.
- Vanderbilt Yards – LIRR yard near the Atlantic Terminal, the western terminus of the Atlantic Branch railroad. It is bounded by Atlantic Avenue to the north, Carlton Avenue to the east, Pacific Street to the south, and 5th Avenue to the west. The Barclays Center was built over it. It is also the site of Pacific Park mixed-use commercial and residential development project.

== Bronx ==
- Oak Point Yard - The second largest yard in New York City (after Sunnyside Yard) and the largest freight yard. Owned and operated by CSX Transportation, the yard supports Hunts Point Cooperative Market.
- Harlem River Intermodal Yard - Intended as an intermodal yard as part of the Oak Point Link, but mostly used for waste handling.
- Highbridge Facility - Owned and operated by Metro-North Railroad.

== Staten Island ==
- Arlington Yard - Freight yard along the former Staten Island Railway North Shore branch. Connects to the Arthur Kill Vertical Lift Bridge and services the New York Container Terminal and the Staten Island Transfer Station.

== See also ==
- New York City Subway yards
- Greenville Yard, on New Jersey side of the New York New Jersey rail float service
- Selkirk Yard - Major CSX facility that supports freight traffic west of the Hudson River
