= New York Connecting Railroad =

Freight rail line in New York City

Overview
- Locale: Queens, New York City
- Dates of operation: 1917–present

Technical
- Track gauge: 4 ft 8 1/2 in (1,435 mm) standard gauge
- Electrification: 12.5 kV, 60 Hz

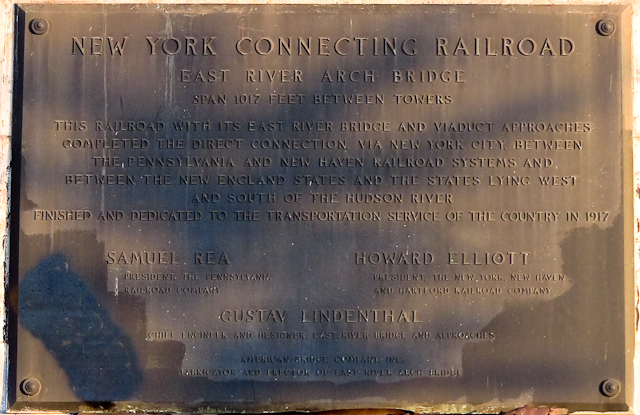
Plaque on Hell Gate Bridge commemorating the opening of the NYCR in 1917

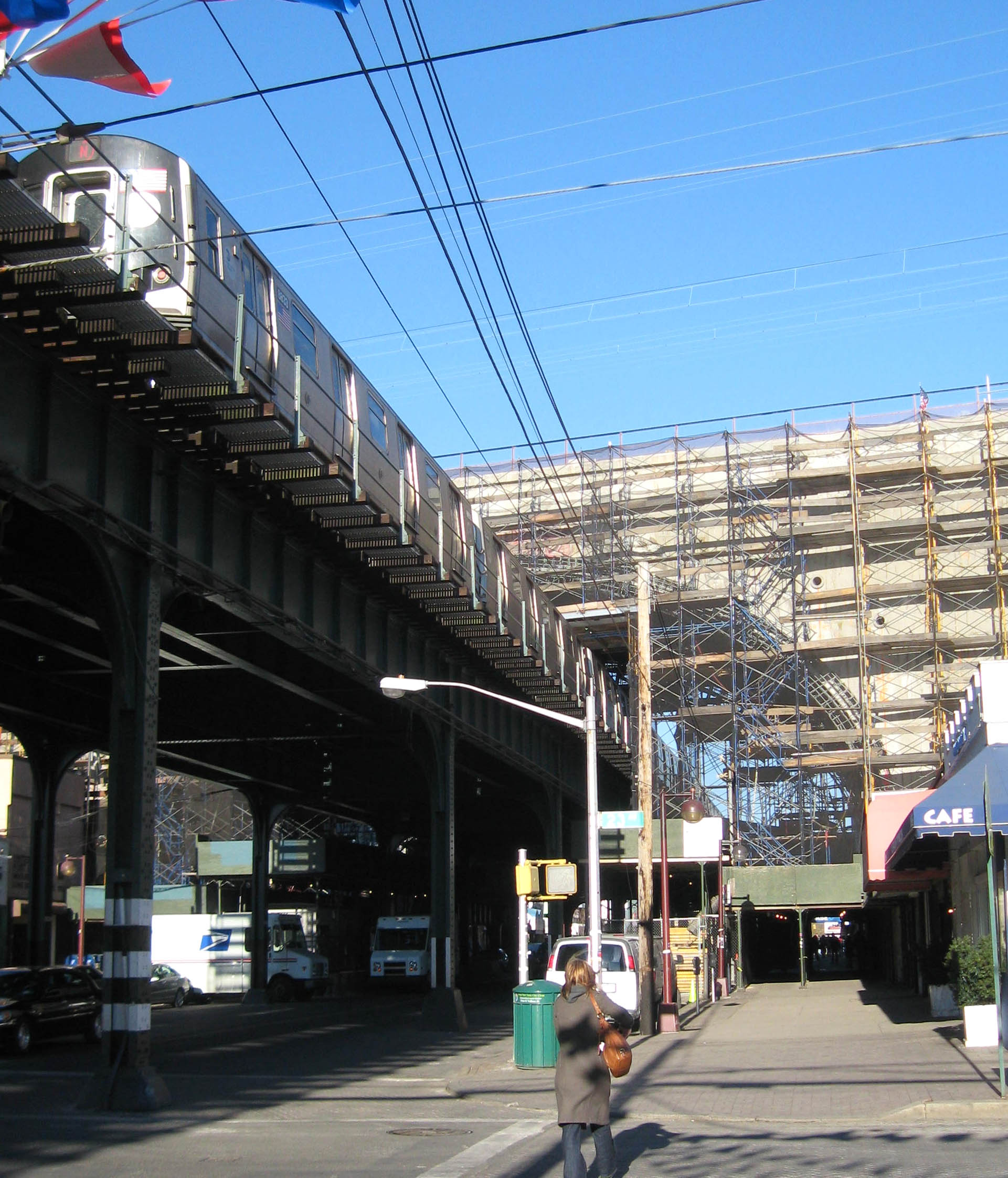
Viaduct arch over Astoria

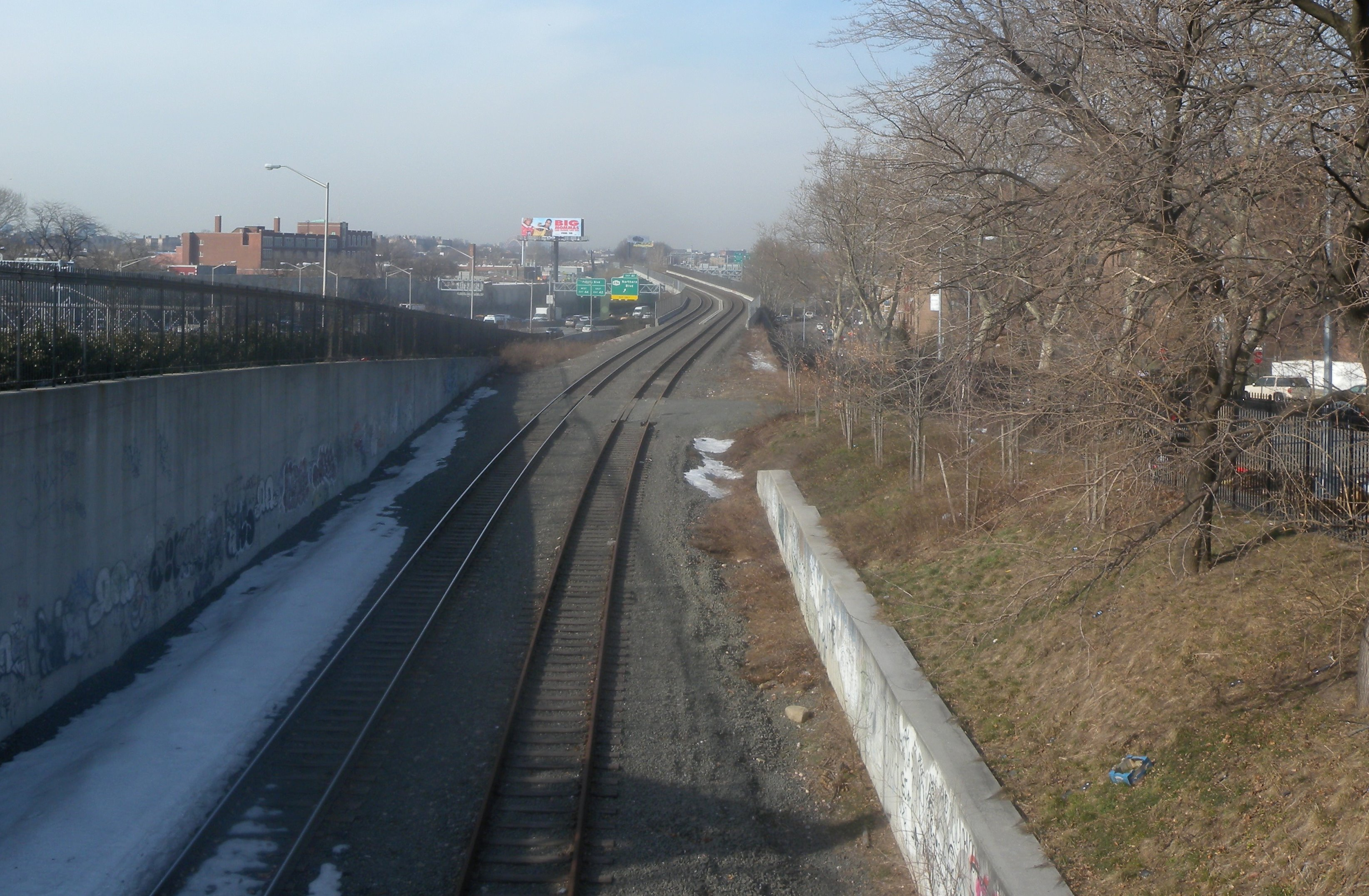
Looking north from 37th Avenue

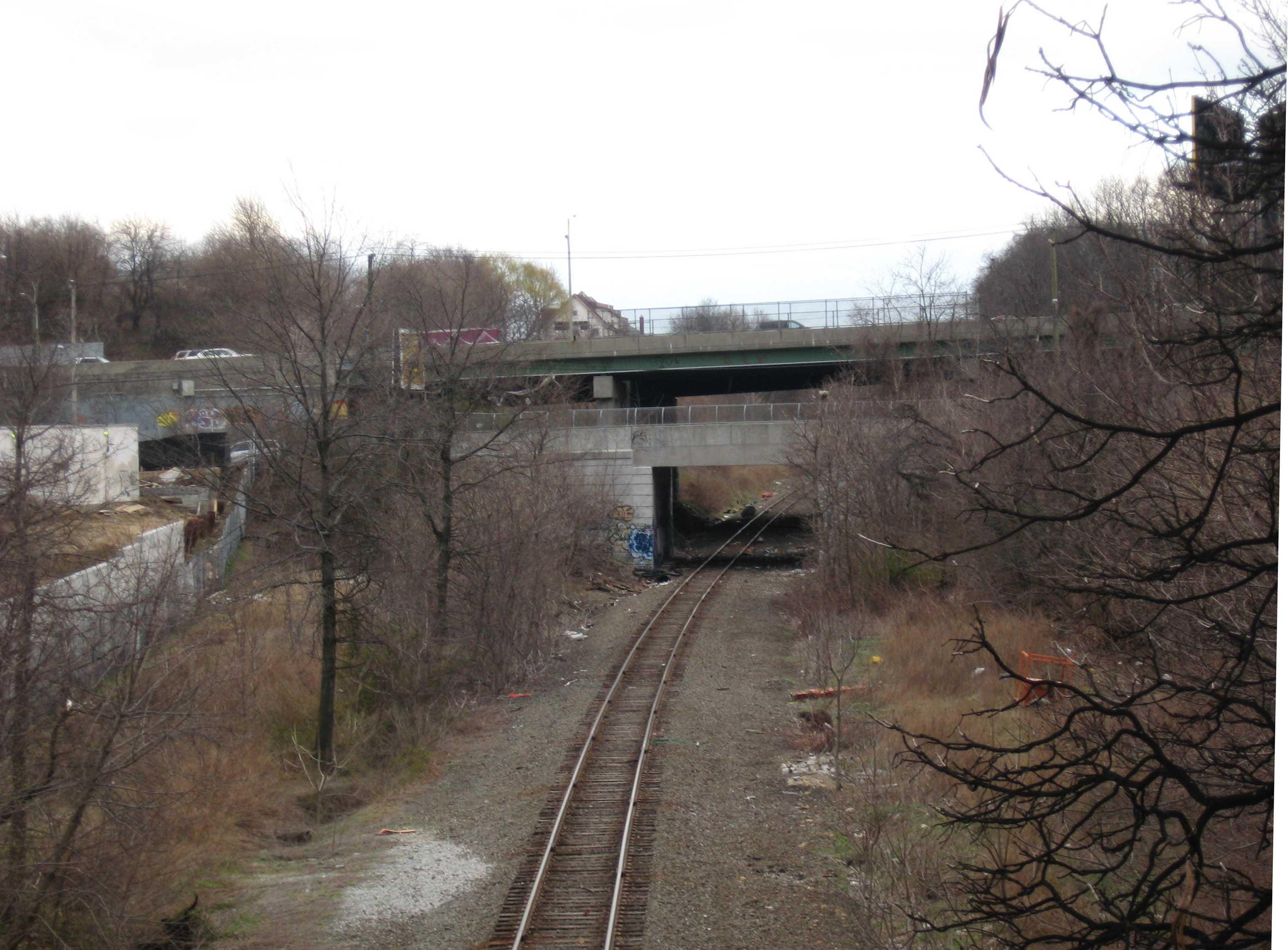
Looking south from Grand Avenue overpass

The New York Connecting Railroad (reporting mark NYCN) or NYCR is a rail line in the borough of Queens in New York City. It links New York City and Long Island by rail directly to the North American mainland. Amtrak, CSX, Canadian Pacific Kansas City, Providence and Worcester Railroad, and the New York and Atlantic Railway (NYAR) currently use the line. Completed in 1917, it runs from the Hell Gate Bridge over the East River to the Fresh Pond Junction yard in Glendale, Queens. Amtrak uses the northernmost section of the line from Sunnyside Junction (Bowery Bay) in the Woodside section of Queens to the Hell Gate Bridge into the Bronx, from which it follows the line north to Boston.

Amtrak owns the line north of Sunnyside Junction, which forms part of the Northeast Corridor. From this point to Fresh Pond Junction CSX is the owner, with the line known as the Fremont Secondary. South of Fresh Pond, the line leads into the Bay Ridge Branch, a freight-only branch owned by the Long Island Rail Road (LIRR) and operated by the New York and Atlantic Railway.

== Route description ==
The NYCR begins at the Hell Gate Bridge over the East River, a massive structure with a main span of 1,017 feet (310 m) and a total length of over 17,000 feet (3.2 mi; 5.2 km). It continues south on a high-level elevated viaduct over Astoria and Interstate 278 (Grand Central Parkway). It rides on an embankment until Sunnyside Junction, where Amtrak's Northeast Corridor line branches off. The line heads south and parallels Interstate 278 (Brooklyn-Queens Expressway) for a distance (which was completely rebuilt in 2002). In the section of Elmhurst, the NYCR passes under several streets in a cut. An arched concrete viaduct over Queens Boulevard is followed by cuts and overpasses over streets in Maspeth, Queens.

After crossing under the Long Island Expressway (Interstate 495) and passing a few cemeteries, the line reaches Fresh Pond Junction. This is the main facility for shipping freight by rail in and out of New York City and Long Island. The New York and Atlantic Railway, which operates freights on the Long Island Rail Road under a privatized concession, has its main offices at Fresh Pond. CSX and PW also interchange freight with NYAR here.

South of Fresh Pond Junction, the line continues south as the LIRR's Bay Ridge Branch to the 65th Street Yard.

The line has three tracks to the north of Sunnyside Junction and one to the south (with some two-track sections).

There is a proposal to connect to the Spuyten Duyvil and Port Morris Railroad spur between the Northeast Corridor at 141st Street to the Harlem Line at 163rd Street and Melrose Avenue, as part of a New York City Subway circumferential line called Interborough Express.

== Operation ==
CSX serves the line with one to three daily round trips, with trains based out of Oak Point Yard. The CSX trains bring general freight to the interchange with the New York and Atlantic Railway at Fresh Pond Junction, in Queens, and return with empties and container loads of solid waste. Providence and Worcester runs three trains per week carrying gravel from Cedar Hill Yard in New Haven, CT, to Fresh Pond.

== History ==
The New York Connecting Railroad was incorporated on April 21, 1892, and was jointly owned by the New York, New Haven and Hartford Railroad (the "New Haven") and the Pennsylvania Railroad (PRR). The line opened in 1917 as a connection between the New Haven's Harlem River and Port Chester Railroad and the PRR East River Tunnels to Penn Station and the North River Tunnels under the Hudson River.

The line was dedicated on March 9, 1917, by PRR President Samuel Rea and engineer Gustav Lindenthal. A special train took the directors of the New Haven over the line on March 25, 1917, and at that time it was turned over to the New Haven for operation, though the Southern Division (freight-only) was not yet complete. Passenger service began on April 1, 1917, with the return of the Federal Express and the rerouting of two local trains. The Colonial began using it April 30, resulting in the first accident on the NYCR on August 20, 1917. Through freights to Bay Ridge began January 17, 1918, and the final work was completed August 7, 1918.

== Electrification ==
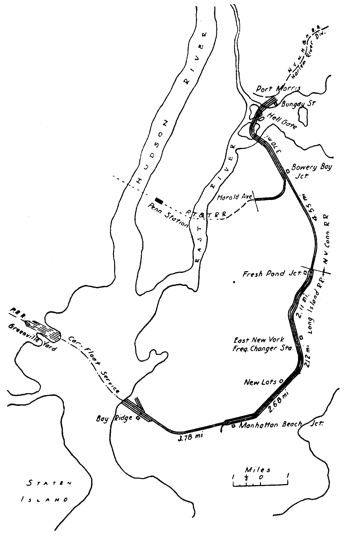
Map showing electrification of NYCRR, c. 1927

The New York Connecting Railroad was electrified around 1917 and last extension completed in 1927 as an extension of the New Haven's system. The NYCR system encompassed 20 route miles (32 km) of track, and was electrified, like the New Haven, using overhead catenary at 11 kV, 25 Hz. The system received power from the New Haven Cos Cob Power Station and Consolidated Edison 201st generating station via the West Farms substation. Additional power was supplied from a 5 MW, 7 kVA, 11 kV, three-phase to single-phase converter installed at East New York. This unit was also operated in synchronous condenser mode for reactive power support. (See Amtrak's 25 Hz traction power system.)

Schematic Diagram of the New Lots substation.

Like the New Haven, the NYCR traction power was distributed using the 2 x 11 kV autotransformer topology. Two wires, the feeder and the catenary (often called the trolley wire), carried voltage of 11 kV to ground, but of opposite phase such that the feeder and catenary were 22 kV phase-to-phase. Six autotransformer stations, spaced an average of 3.8 miles (6.1 km) apart along the line, converted power. Each station contained oil circuit breakers for both feeder and trolley buses, bus sectioning switches, and one (Note: All had one transformer but for Fourth Ave, which had two.) 3 MVA outdoor autotransformer.

The LIRR portion of the system (essentially everything to the south of Bowery Bay), along with the freight catenary from West Farms over Hell Gate to Bowery Bay, was removed in 1969–1970. By 1986 Amtrak, which had inherited the Connecting Railroad, changed the traction power system over to 60 Hz operation coincident with the Metro-North Railroad re-powering of the New Haven Line at 60 Hz and de-activation of the Cos Cob Power Station. The autotransformer architecture was retained, but the source of power changed from the Metro-North New Haven Line system to the Con Edison-supplied Van Nest Substation (40.8420°N 73.8633°W).

Autotransformer Stations along the New York Connecting Railroad
Location	Trolley Breakers	Feeder Breakers	Coordinates	Comments
Bungay Street	5	6		
Bowery Bay	9	6	40.7643°N 73.9054°W	Catenary Bridge C68. Converted to 60 Hz operation circa 1986. Amtrak SS number 45.
Fresh Pond	9	6		
New Lots	9	6		
Manhattan Beach Jct	7	8		
Fourth Ave., Bay Ridge	6	4		

== See also ==
- Pennsylvania Tunnel and Terminal Railroad (PRR Tunnel Construction Project 1902–1910)
