= Spuyten Duyvil and Port Morris Railroad =

Former New York railroad company (1842–1871)

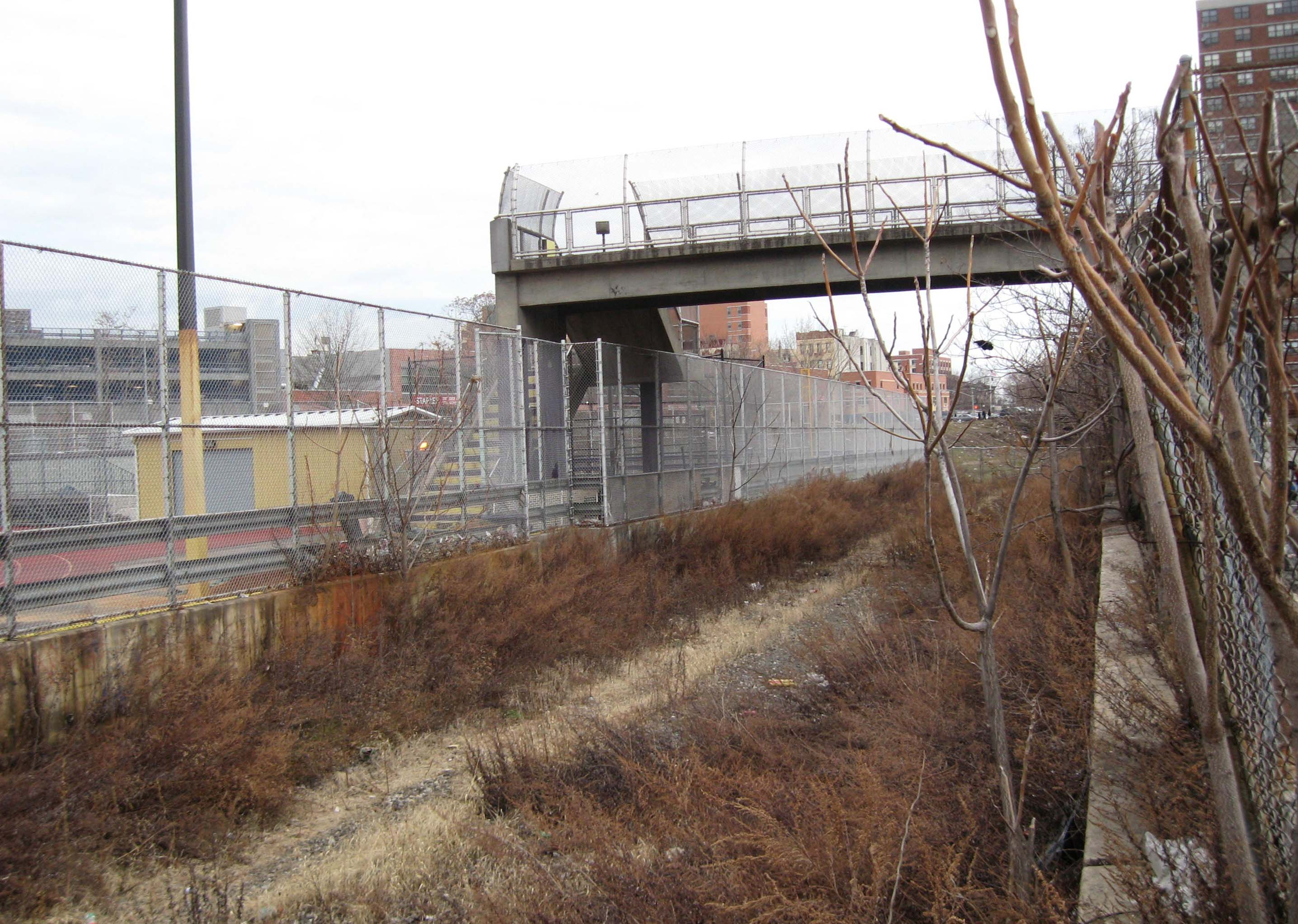
- An abandoned section of the Port Morris Branch near Rae Street in Melrose, Bronx

Overview
- Locale: The Bronx, NY
- Dates of operation: 1842–1871
- Successor: New York Central and Hudson River Railroad

Spuyten Duyvil and Port Morris Railroad was a railroad built in what is today the West Bronx and South Bronx in New York City, United States. It ran from the junction between the West Side Line and the Hudson River Railroad near Spuyten Duyvil Creek, then along the Harlem River to the northwestern shore of the East River in what is today the Port Morris section of the Bronx. Part of the line was incorporated into the Metro-North Railroad's Hudson Line, while other parts were abandoned and removed.

== History ==
=== Waterfront section ===
The Spuyten Duyvil and Port Morris Railroad was built in 1842, and bought by the New York and Harlem Railroad in 1853, as part of a proposal by NY&H Vice President Gouverneur Morris Jr. to integrate it into a new industrial section of the waterfront. In 1864, the entire NY&H including the SD&PM was acquired by the New York Central and Hudson River Railroad (NYC) and the segment north of Mott Haven Junction became part of the NYC Hudson Division, whereas the remaining Port Morris Branch continued its status as part of the Harlem Division. By 1871, it connected what became the New York and Putnam Railroad to the Hudson River Railroad. By 1905–1906, the line had been rebuilt and electrified.

When the Harlem River Ship Canal was built, the line was realigned along the north side in Marble Hill, Manhattan. Part of the original segment around Marble Hill became a freight spur leading to the Kingsbridge Freight Station, but the track around the northern and western sides of Marble Hill was later removed and no trace of it exists. Today, the realigned line serves as the segment of the Metro-North Railroad Hudson Line between Mott Haven Junction and the West Side Line. The former Kingsbridge Freight Spur and station has been occupied by the grounds of the John F. Kennedy High School since the 1970s. The New York and Putnam Railroad spur remained until 1999.

=== Port Morris Branch ===
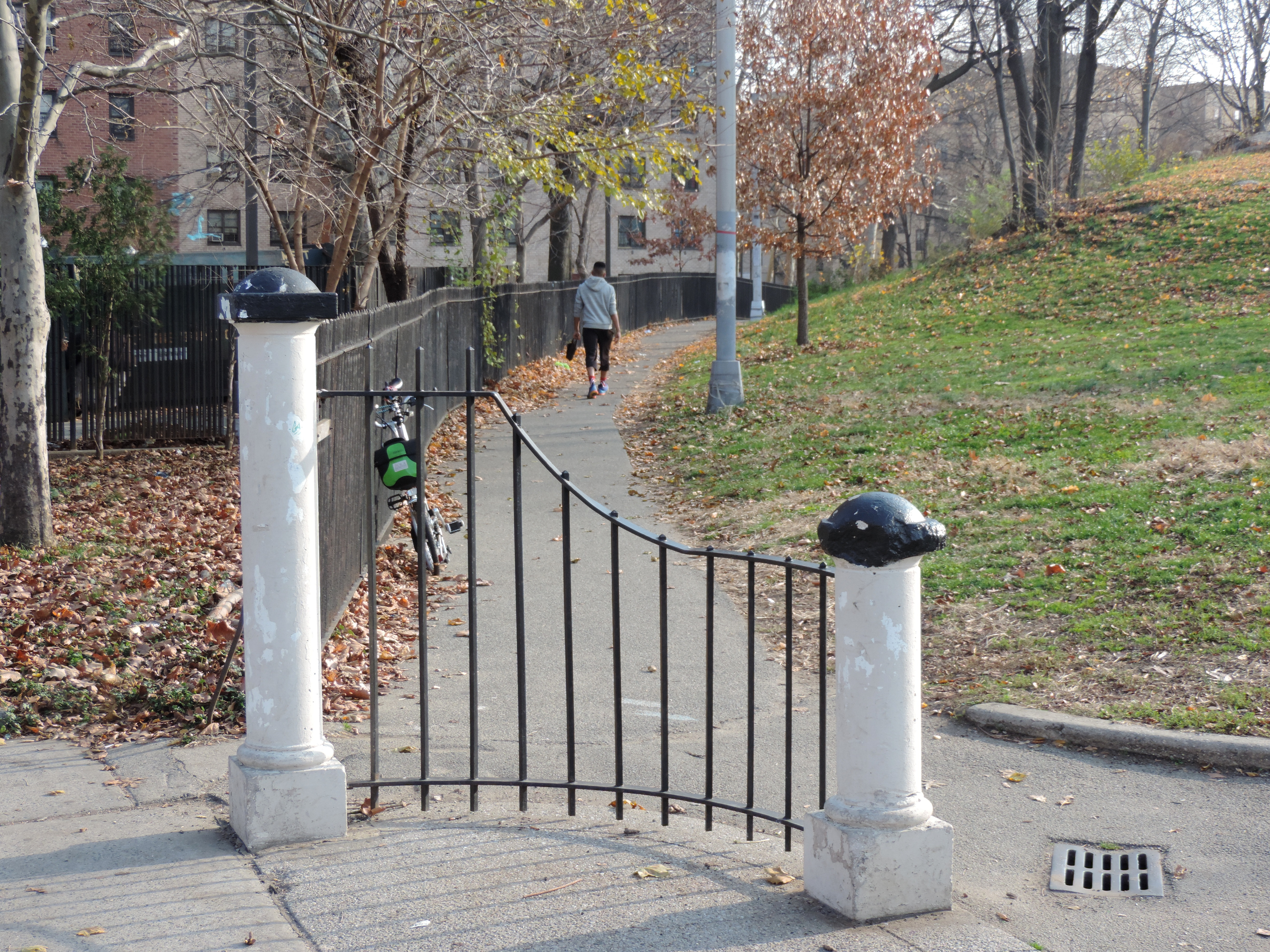
Footpath in St Mary's Park approximates the original surface route of the Port Morris Branch

The Port Morris Branch began at a wye north of Melrose Station, then extended southeast through The Hub, through a 2,200-to-2,300-foot-long (671 to 701 m) tunnel (built 1905) under St. Mary's Park, and finally Port Morris along the East River just after crossing a bridge beneath the Harlem River and Port Chester Branch of the New York, New Haven and Hartford Railroad. A connecting wye existed partially beneath the bridge lead to the New Haven Railroad-owned Oak Point Yard as well as the HR&PC itself. The only two stations along this branch were at Westchester Avenue between Brook and St Ann's Avenues 40°48′57″N 73°54′46″W and at Port Morris itself across the river from North Brother Island.

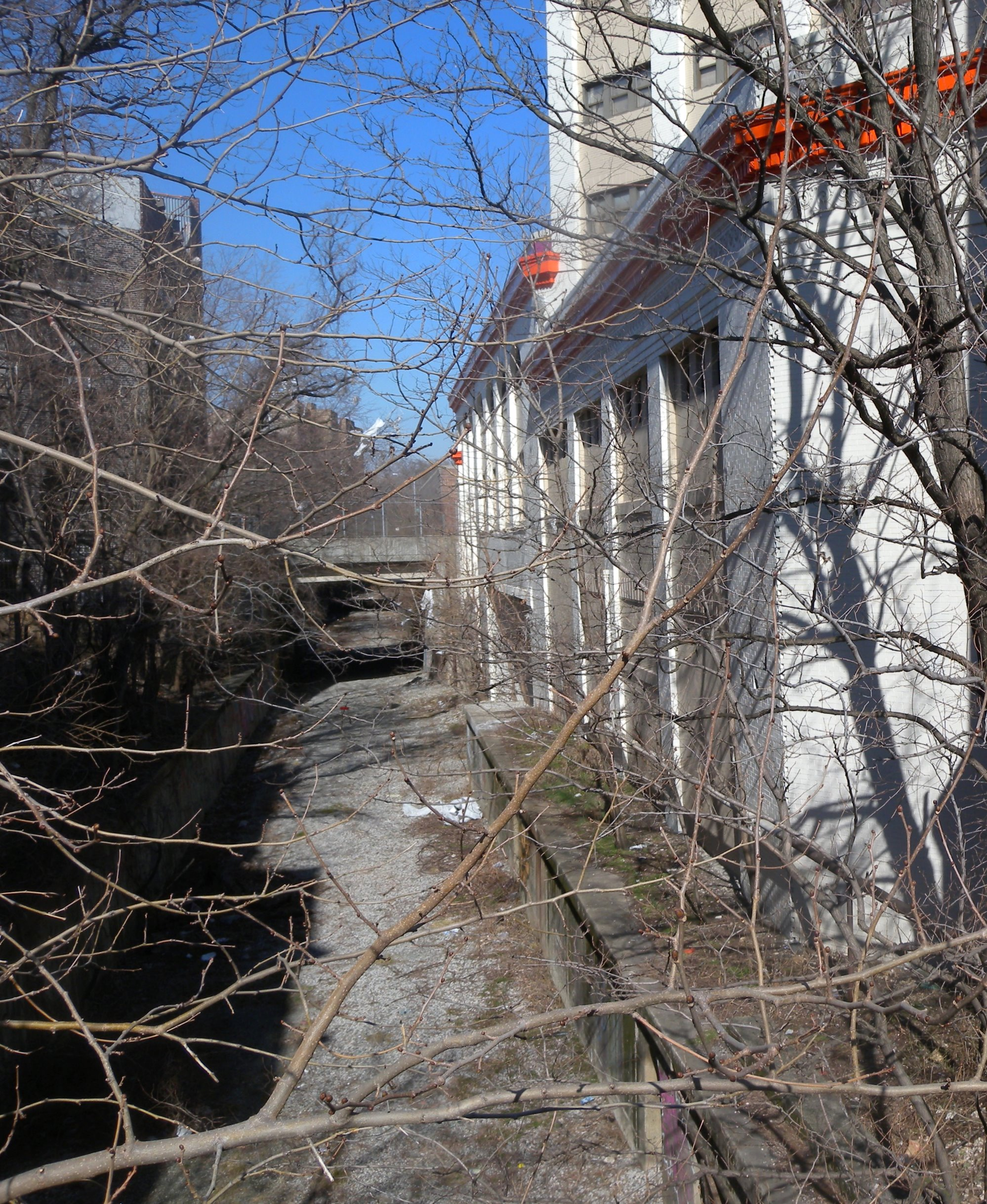
Trackbed near Southern Boulevard

After World War II, the Port Morris Branch faced decades of underutilization and the increase in poverty and rampant violence from the surrounding neighborhoods, as well as low clearance and poor drainage. By the 1970s, a new bypass was being proposed because of the clearance and tight curves of the Port Morris Branch's tunnels, which could not fit contemporary train cars. After the construction of the Oak Point Link at the Bronx's southern tip and its subsequent opening in 1998, the Port Morris Branch ceased to be used in 1999; formal abandonment was declared in 2003, when CSX Transportation declared that the branch could be vacated due to the lack of use in the preceding two years. The Oak Point Yard remains just northeast of the site of the port, and an industrial track in the vicinity of the Port Morris station still survives south of Southern Boulevard. The rest of the track bed had a sizable homeless and drug-dealer encampment, was strewn with garbage, and is frequently flooded due to the poor drainage and its location below sea level.

The "Mott Haven Swamp," as the corridor was called in the late 2000s due to the 625,000 US gallons (2,370,000 L; 520,000 imp gal) of stagnant water inside the trench, was pumped in 2009 for $350,000, although the garbage was allowed to remain. It is unknown who had owned the track bed, though different sections had been purchased by several private organizations.

Restoration was proposed in 2014, to connect the Harlem Line to an expanded LaGuardia Airport. In 2015 the homeless encampment was vacated and bulldozed. Afterward, another plan was made to connect the spur to the Harlem Line and to the New York Connecting Railroad as part of a New York City Subway circumferential line called Triboro RX. However, these plans were complicated due to the private ownership of the land next to the right-of-way, as well as a new housing development directly on the right-of-way at 156th Street.

== Station list ==
The entire line is in Bronx County, New York, except for the realigned segment in Marble Hill, Manhattan. All stations between DV interlocking and Mott Haven Junction, and between Melrose and Port Morris, are read from north to south; the segment between Mott Haven Junction and Port Morris is read from south to north.

Station	Date opened	Date closed	Notes
Junction with Hudson Line and West Side Line
Spuyten Duyvil	c. 1870s		
Original line diverges; Junction with former Kingsbridge Freight Spur
Kingsbridge	c. 1870s	c. 1906	Not to be confused with the New York and Putnam Railroad station of the same name
Bridge under Broadway Bridge and IRT Broadway–Seventh Avenue Line
Marble Hill	c. 1906		Replacement for Kingsbridge station
Junction with NYC Putnam Division
Fordham Heights	c. 1870s	Before 1920	
University Heights	c. 1870s		
Morris Heights	c. 1870s		
High Bridge	c. 1870s	June 3, 1975	Metro-North employee stop for the Highbridge Facility
Sedgwick Avenue	1918	1958	Putnam Division and IRT Ninth Avenue Line only
Mott Haven Junction; SD&PM line turns north along Harlem Line
Melrose	c. 1890		
Melrose Wye; Harlem Line diverges
Westchester Avenue			
West Junction with Oak Point Yard
Bridge under Harlem River and Port Chester Railroad (NH)
East Junction with Oak Point Yard
Port Morris		c. 1850s	Former connection to North Brother Island and Rikers Island ferries
