= Oak Point Link =

Freight rail line in New York City

Coordinates: 40°48′00″N 73°54′47″W

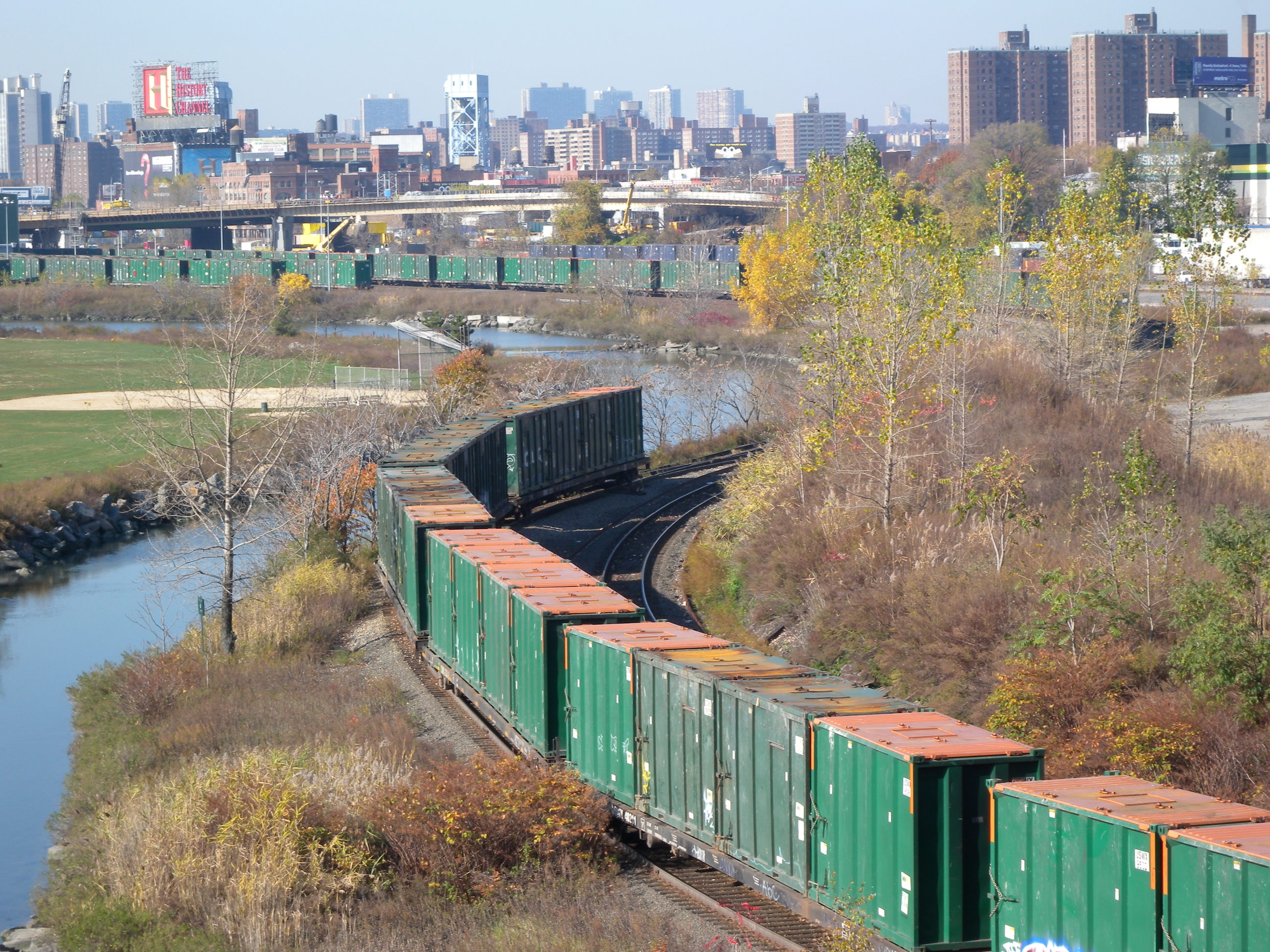
- Looking northwest from Robert F. Kennedy Bridge with the Harlem River Yard in the background. Green containers on train are for hauling municipal solid waste (trash).

Overview
- Other name: South Bronx–Oak Point Link
- Owner: State of New York
- Locale: Port Morris, Bronx
- Termini: Highbridge Facility; Oak Point Yard

Service
- Type: Freight
- System: CSX Transportation

History
- Opened: 1998

Technical
- Line length: 1.9 mi (3.1 km)
- Num of tracks: 1
- Track gauge: 4 ft 8 1/2 in (1,435 mm) standard gauge

The Oak Point Link, also known as the South Bronx–Oak Point Link, is a 1.9-mile (3.1 km) long railroad line in the Bronx, New York City, United States, along the east bank of the Harlem River. It connects the Metro-North Railroad's Hudson Line (on the Spuyten Duyvil and Port Morris Railroad section) with the Harlem River Intermodal Yard and the CSX Transportation Oak Point Yard at the north end of the Hell Gate Bridge.

== History ==
In 1975, the New York State Department of Transportation (NYSDOT) began planning a set of improvements to modernize the freight system for the New York City and Long Island area to promote increased rail freight service and to expand and stabilize the existing industrial job base. A key element of the plan was the raising of 18 low overhead bridges between Selkirk Yard near Albany and Highbridge Facility in the Bronx to have vertical clearances of at least 17.5 feet (5.3 m); this project was estimated to be completed in 1982. The increased vertical clearance was intended to allow 25% of conventional boxcars and trailer-on-flatcar (TOFC) fleets to operate along New York City's freight lines; TOFCs could only reach New York City from rail terminals in New Jersey. At the time, freight access via the Hudson Division was limited by overhead clearances of 15.25 feet (4.65 m) and capacity limitations due to passage over the New Haven, Harlem and Hudson commuter rail lines. New York State's Intermodal Study found that 9.6 percent of conventional rail cars in the United States were too high to use the Hudson Division in 1977, a number that increased to 15.4 percent in 1979 and was expected to soon increase to 40 percent. To avoid clearance issues on the Hudson Division, 6,000 cars were rerouted via Springfield, Massachusetts and New Haven, Connecticut, a route that provided an addition 3 inches (7.6 cm) of clearance, but delayed shipments by 24 to 36 hours and added 100 miles (160 km) of travel.

In September 1981, an Environmental Assessment was published by the United States Coast Guard (USCG) and the NYSDOT to address the development of a TOFC facility at the Harlem River Yard and to provide clearance improvements between Highbridge Yard and Oak Point Yard. On December 3, 1981, the USCG published a Notice of Intent in the Federal Register to prepare an Environmental Impact Statement. The project's funding was provided by the 1974 Rail Preservation Bond Act and the 1979 Energy Conservation Bond Issue, and from the Port Authority of New York and New Jersey.

=== Alternatives ===
Prior to the study conducted by the USCG and the NYSDOT, options to ameliorate the issue included a new rail tunnel under the Hudson River, the rehabilitation of the Poughkeepsie Bridge, the use of the North River Tunnels, a cross-harbor rail ferry, the use of low-profile piggyback equipment and the use of the Harlem, New Haven, and Hudson Divisions through the removal of clearance restrictions. All of the options, with the exception of the options to remove clearance restrictions were quickly rejected. The Harlem Line option was dismissed since it would have required the lifting of 53 bridges, with many of the bridges to be lifted located every other block in a 3 miles (4.8 km)-long stretch in the Central Bronx, requiring the lifting of adjacent streets and properties. The New Haven Line option was dismissed due to a conflict with passenger service as the line's catenary would have to be raised, requiring a great expenditure and disrupting service on the Northeast Corridor.

Multiple alternatives were considered to achieve the project's goals during the project's engineering studies, all using the Hudson Division between Selkirk and Highbridge Yards. The alternatives decided upon took into account expected expansion of commuter and intercity passenger service through Mott Haven Junction during most of the day, which would have hindered service via the Port Morris Branch. Three options were considered, but were dismissed at the beginning of the planning process. The Zig Zag Route would have made improvements to the existing Port Morris Branch, including the installation of crossovers, the raising of bridges in some locations, and the depression of the track in others. This option was deemed unacceptable due to conflicts with passenger traffic along the route, and Conrail and the MTA informed NYSDOT that they would refuse to consider clearance improvements along this route due to the conflicts. Projects for passenger traffic in 2000 would have limited freight movement along this route to a few hours at night.

The 138th Street Connector would have connected Harlem River Yard with the Hudson Division at East 138th Street, avoiding Melrose Junction, and like the Zig Zag route, it would have required the installation of crossovers, the raising of bridges in some locations, and the depression of the track in others. This route would have also resulted in conflicts with passenger service, albeit somewhat less than the Zig Zag Route. This route would have required the construction of a rail trestle with steep grades to avoid conflicts with structures such as the Major Deegan Expressway. The Market Route East subalternative would have started at the southern end of Highbridge Yard using the existing single track servicing the Bronx Terminal Market and would have passed along the east edge of the overflow parking area at Yankee Stadium before running parallel to the Hudson Division, crossing Exterior Street to the shore at the East 149th Street Bridge, and then following the Shore Route alignment. This option would have required an at-grade crossing just north of East 150th Street on Exterior Street, would have required the elimination of 80 parking spots at Yankee Stadium, and would have required the relocation of four businesses. Trains would have had to run very slowly through this route.

The remaining options were the Shore Route, the Offshore Route, and the Market Route West subalternative. The Shore Route would have consisted of a one-track concrete trestle running from Highbridge Yard to Lincoln Avenue for 1.7 miles (2.7 km). To provide a clearance of 17.5 feet (5.3 m), several highway bridges would have needed to be modified and the shoreline would need to be stabilized. In addition, three bridge crossings over the Harlem River would have needed to be modified. This option would have cost $58.5 million. This option would have eliminated 20 parking spaces at Yankee Stadium, would have restricted the use of a portion of the Bronx shoreline, and would have disrupted some nearby businesses. Construction on this option was expected to take 2 to 2.5 years.

The Offshore Route would be very similar to the Shore Route, with the exception that it would have been constructed beyond the bulkhead and pier line from Highbridge Yard to the East 138th Street Bridge, a distance of 0.9 miles (1.4 km). This option was estimated to cost $45.5 million, and would have required Congressional deauthorization of a portion of the Harlem River channel, which could have taken at least 18 months to complete. This option was expected to be cheaper than the Shore Route as its engineering and construction were simpler and because the cost of required real estate acquisitions was much lower. This option had a greater chance than the Shore Route option of getting hit by boats.The Market Route West is subalternative for the section between Highbridge Yard and the East 149th Street Bridge. The Market Route West/Shore Route alternative would cost $44.5 million, while the Market Route West/Offshore Route would have cost $38.5 million. These options would have been constructed in a fenced alignment using ballasted track. This option would have allowed for enhanced flexibility of market operations if abandoned sidings on the Terminal Market's east edge were reconnected This option would have required the loss of 85 parking spaces at Yankee Stadium, and would have cutoff an access ramp to the Major Deegan Expressway from the north end of Bronx Terminal Market. The construction of these options would have limited the Port Morris Branch for local freight use.

Four options were considered for the TOFC plant (Oak Point Yard and Harlem River Yard in the Bronx, 65th Street Yard in Brooklyn and Sunnyside Yard in Queens), and it was decided to build it at Harlem River Yard. A new main line track would have been constructed along the southern perimeter of the TOFC yard for trains to and from Oak Point and Long Island.

=== Opening ===
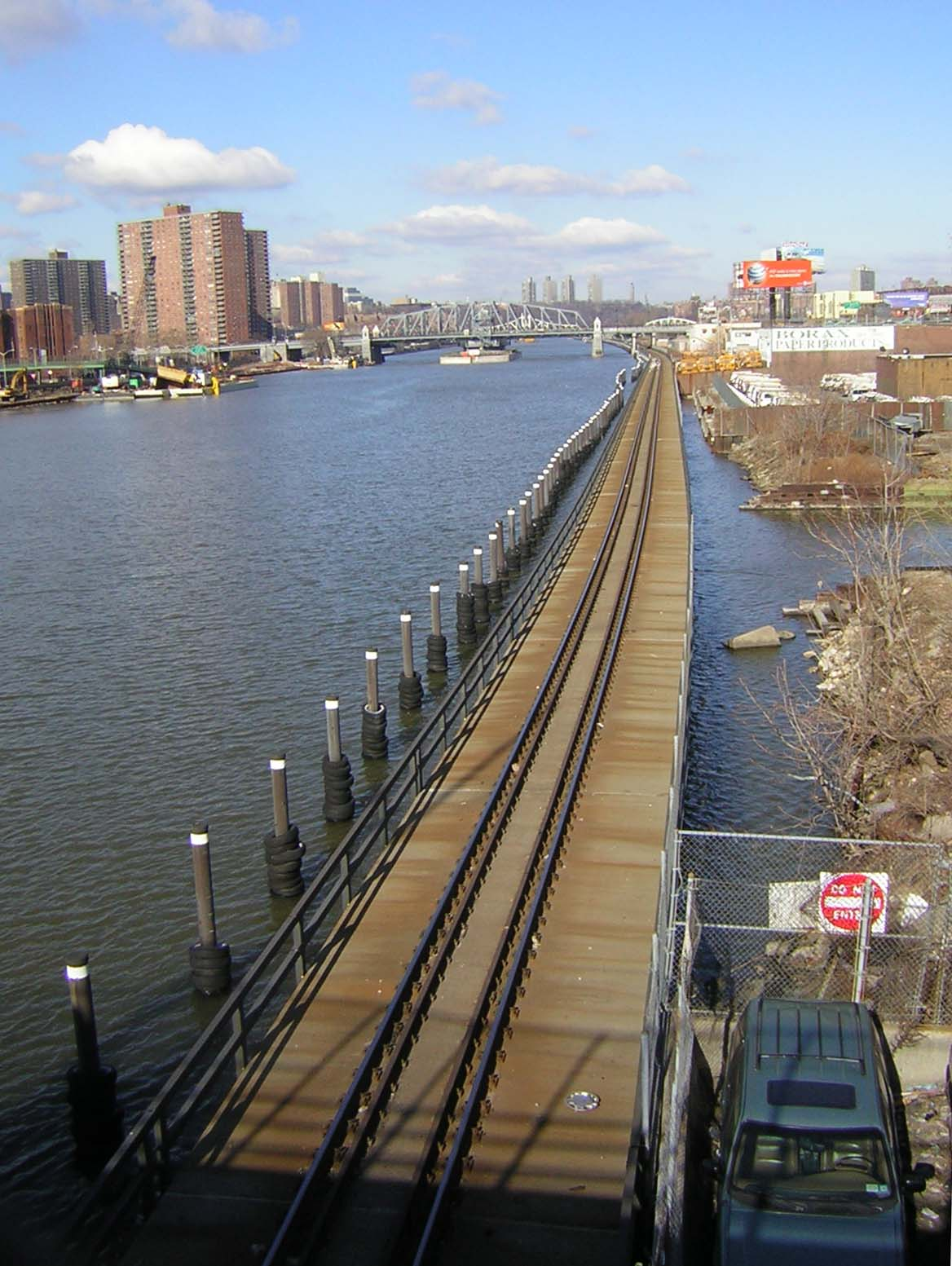
A portion of the Oak Point Link constructed as a viaduct along the east bank of the Harlem River, looking north from the Madison Avenue Bridge

The line, constructed and owned by the State of New York, opened in 1998 to allow better freight rail access to the city by eliminating the need to use the Port Morris Branch, a more circuitous route that crossed busy commuter lines and whose tight turns (at Mott Haven and Melrose) limited the length of freight cars. It was funded in part by the Port Authority of New York and New Jersey. The new line was built with a structure gauge high enough for trailer-on-flat car (TOFC) intermodal freight transport service, but is not high enough for double stack container service, due to limits imposed by city bridges crossing over the line and the high tides on the Harlem River. Construction of the line began in 1983 and cost $187 million to complete. Including that sum, more than $375 million of public money has been spent to upgrade track to TOFC clearance between Selkirk Yard near Albany and Fresh Pond Junction yard on Long Island.

The line also gives Canadian Pacific Railway (CP)'s subsidiary Delaware and Hudson Railway (D&H) access to New York City. The access was mandated by the Surface Transportation Board to give competition to CSX's post-Conrail breakup monopoly on New York City and encourage freight in the area to use rail. CP uses trackage rights over CSX and Metro-North from Schenectady south along the east side of the Hudson River to the connection. The first train to use it ran on October 12, 1998, according to The New York Times.

In 2010 CSX and CP's Delaware and Hudson subsidiary asked the Surface Transportation Board to approve an arrangement where CSX will carry freight for D&H over the Oak Point link, though D&H retains trackage rights. D&H in turn will carry freight for CSX from Saratoga, NY to the Canada–US border.

Local service from Oak Point Yard runs to an interchange with the New York and Atlantic Railway (NY&A) at Fresh Pond Junction Yard in Queens. From Fresh Pond the NY&A takes freight to customers on the Long Island Rail Road, as well as the city-owned 65th Street Yard in Bay Ridge, Brooklyn, via the Bay Ridge Branch.

== See also ==
- Cross-Harbor Rail Tunnel

== Sources ==
- Greenstein, Joe (April 2002). "Canadian Pacific In NYC". Trains. 62 (4): 52–57.
