= Sunnyside Yard =

Rail yard in Queens, New York

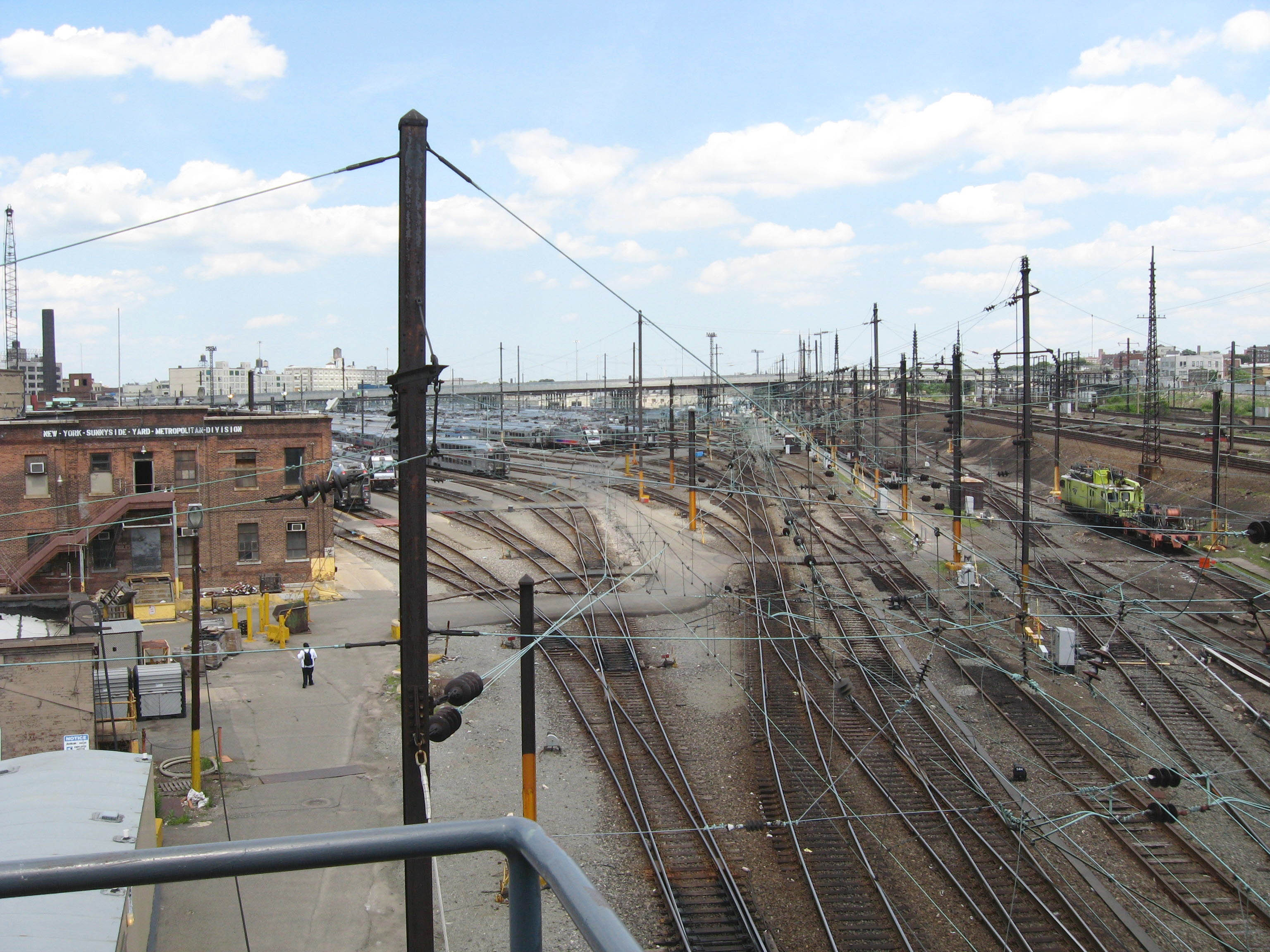
- Southern part of Sunnyside Yard, looking east from Queens Boulevard overpass

General information
- Location: Queens, New York City; U.S.
- Coordinates: 40.748°N 73.933°W
- Operator: Amtrak

History
- Opened: 1910 (116 years ago)
Location

Sunnyside Yard is a large coach yard in the Sunnyside neighborhood of Queens, New York City. Owned by Amtrak and also used by New Jersey Transit and the Long Island Rail Road (LIRR), the yard was built by the Pennsylvania Railroad (PRR) and completed in 1910 with an as-built footprint of 192 acres (0.78 km^{2}) and 25.7 miles (41.4 km) of track. The yard served as the principal storage and servicing facility for PRR trains using Pennsylvania Station in Manhattan, to which it is connected by the East River Tunnels.

The yard incorporates Harold Interlocking, described as of 2012 as one of the busiest rail junctions in the United States, where Amtrak's Northeast Corridor crosses the LIRR Main Line and the Hell Gate Line. A balloon track at the yard's eastern end is used to turn Amtrak and NJ Transit trains terminating at Penn Station. Following the Penn Central merger of 1968 and that company's bankruptcy, the yard passed to Conrail and then to Amtrak in 1976; Amtrak continues to own and operate the facility.

Since the opening of Grand Central Madison in January 2023, some LIRR trains pass through tunnels beneath the yard as part of the East Side Access project. The MTA's Penn Station Access project, which will bring Metro-North Railroad service into Penn Station via the Hell Gate Line with four new stations in the eastern Bronx, is expected to further increase rail traffic through Harold Interlocking; full completion was rescheduled in 2025 to 2030.

Decades of railroad operations left soil, sewer, and groundwater contamination at the yard, which was listed in the 1980s as a Class 2 site in the New York State Registry of Inactive Hazardous Waste Disposal Sites and has been remediated under NYSDEC oversight across six operable units. Amtrak and the LIRR are also among the potentially responsible parties named for the adjacent Newtown Creek Superfund site.

Beginning in 2017, the New York City Economic Development Corporation (NYCEDC) studied constructing a deck over the rail yard to support affordable housing. A 2020 master plan envisioned 12,000 affordable housing units alongside 60 acres (24 ha) of parks and public space, but the proposal lay dormant during the COVID-19 pandemic. In February 2026, Mayor Zohran Mamdani revived the proposal, asking the federal government for $21 billion to build the deck and 12,000 affordable homes after meeting with President Donald Trump in Washington, D.C.; reactions among Queens elected officials and community groups have been mixed.

== Site and layout ==
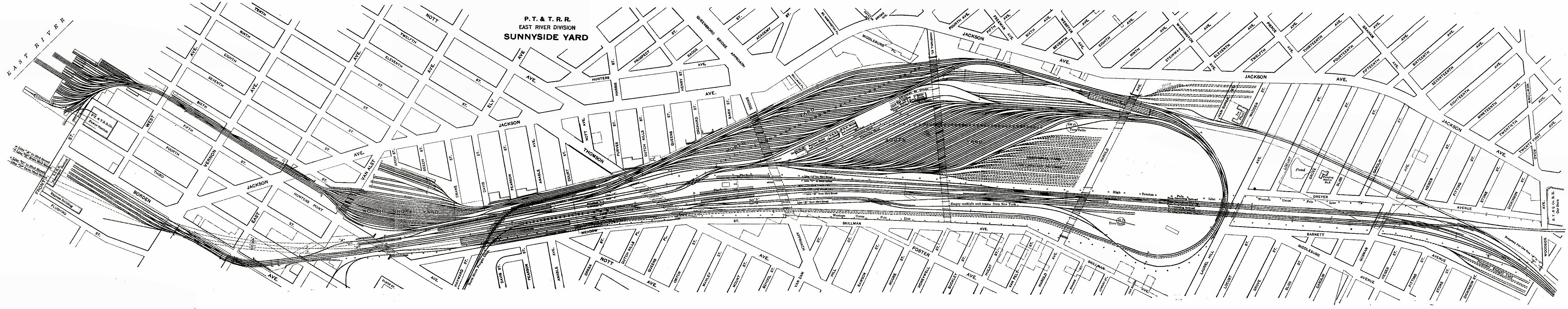
"General Plan of Sunnyside Yard," prepared by resident engineer Louis H. Barker in 1906 and submitted to the New York City Board of Estimate

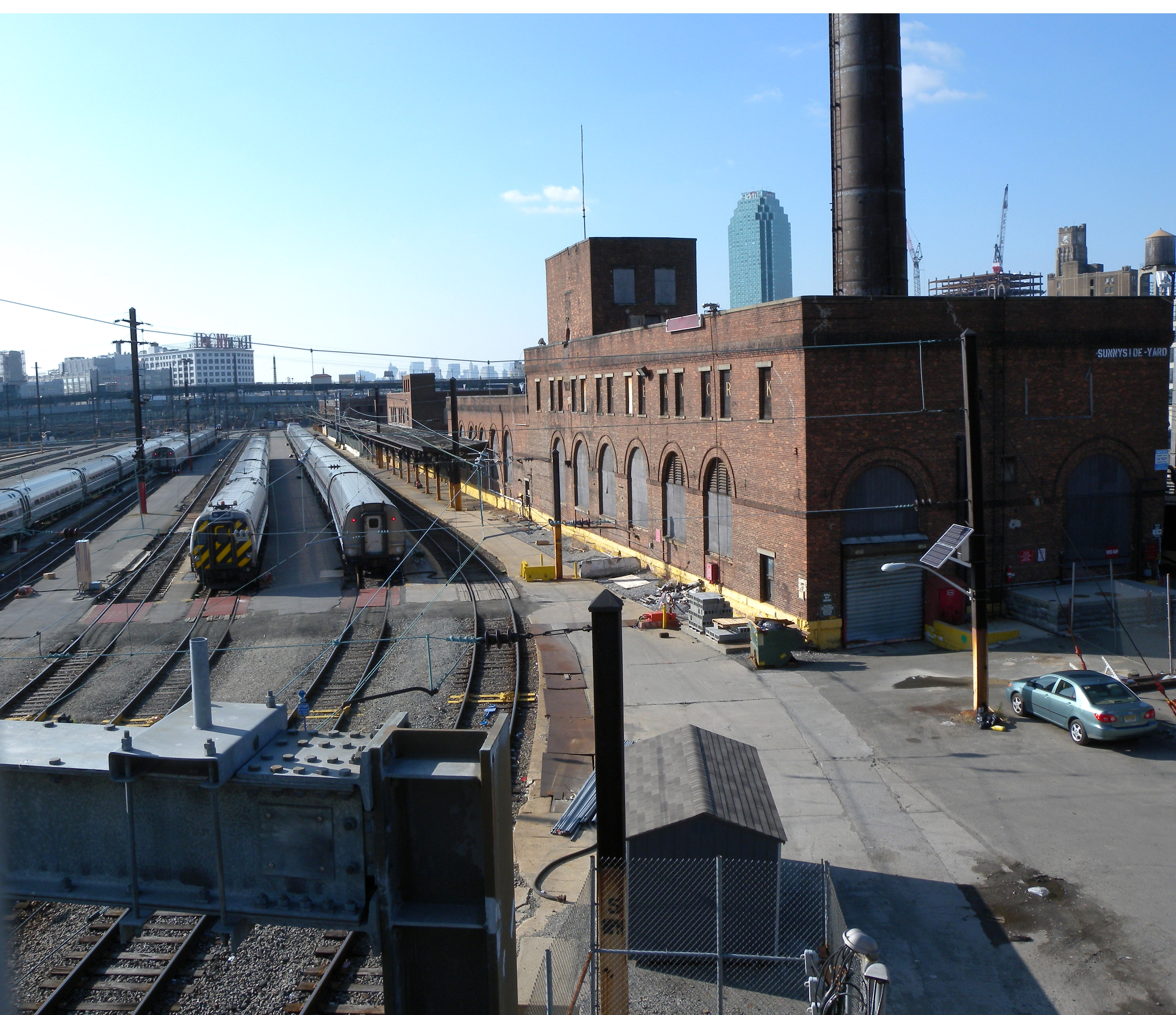
Former boiler house and substation, part of the yard's original electrification infrastructure

Sunnyside Yard occupies a long, narrow site in western Queens, New York City, bounded on the south by Skillman Avenue, on the north by Northern Boulevard, and extending eastward toward Woodside, with the East River Tunnels portal area at its western end. As built in 1910, the yard had an overall length of 8,815 feet (2,687 m), a maximum width of 1,625 feet (495 m), and an initial footprint of 192 acres (0.78 km^{2}) with 25.7 miles (41.4 km) of track. At completion, the yard was divided into a North Yard and a South Yard. The North Yard initially contained 42 tracks with capacity for 526 passenger cars; the South Yard contained 45 tracks with a 552-car capacity, with provision to expand the South Yard by 32 additional tracks for a further 309 cars. Although the yard is "stub-end" in geographic terms (sitting at the end of the division), it functions as "double-end" in terms of train movements, served by two loop tracks running from the East River Tunnels around the yard to its eastern end. The New York City Economic Development Corporation (NYCEDC) has used a working figure of 180 acres (73 ha) for the modern rail-yard footprint considered for air-rights development. Ownership of the yard is divided among Amtrak, the MTA, and General Motors. Amtrak owns about 142 acres (57 ha), the MTA about 31 acres (13 ha) (with New York City holding the air rights over the MTA parcels), and General Motors owns a facility of roughly 7 acres (2.8 ha) in the yard's southeastern section.

Because it occupies a long, narrow site, local commentators have described the yard as a physical barrier in western Queens. The local historian Mitch Waxman wrote that the yard "tends to insulate Long Island City from the rest of western Queens, forcing its residential and business traffic to pass through and around narrow or crowded choke points like Queens Plaza." Supporters of decking over the yard have framed the project as a way to reconnect neighborhoods it separates. The master plan's architects called the yard "a profound gap in our city's fabric," and an Astoria resident told Streetsblog that what he called "a wasteland that divides Sunnyside and Astoria" could instead "knit the communities together."

The shared tracks of the LIRR Main Line and Amtrak's Northeast Corridor adjoin the yard. The adjacent Sunnyside Gardens Historic District (south of the yard) was added to the National Register of Historic Places in 1984 and the Hunters Point Historic District (west of the yard) was designated by the New York City Landmarks Preservation Commission in 1968.

== History ==
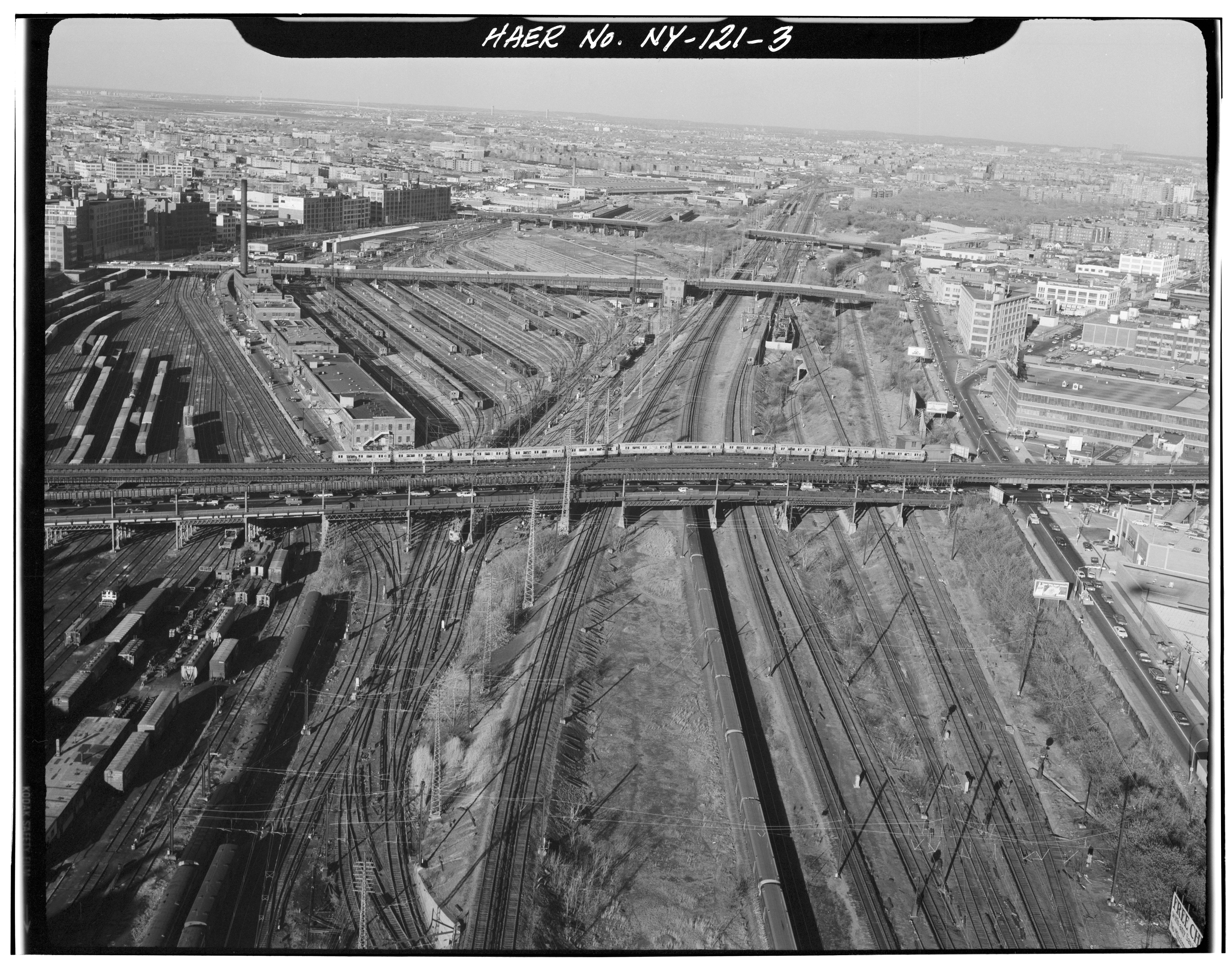
Honeywell Street Bridge and elevated subway bridge crossing Sunnyside Yard, photographed by Jack E. Boucher in 1977 as part of the Historic American Engineering Record's Northeast Railroad Corridor survey (HAER NY-121)

=== Site before 1903 ===
The Sunnyside Yard footprint lies within the historic settlement area of Dutch Kills in western Queens. Burgon Brocard (or Bragaw), a French Huguenot exile from Mannheim in the Rhenish Palatinate who had emigrated to Manhattan in 1675, in 1690 acquired a farm of several hundred acres at Dutch Kills, on the site where Burger Jorissen had established a grist mill around 1648; the property descended through several generations of the Brocard/Bragaw family. Richard Bragaw built a gambrel-roofed house in the English style atop Sunnyside Hill in 1790, on the line of present-day 32nd Place halfway between Northern Boulevard and Skillman Avenue, within what would become the yard footprint. The area takes its name from "Sunnyside Hill," the Bragaw family estate at Dutch Kills established with that 1690 purchase and consolidated under Brocard's son Isaac in 1713; a "Sunnyside" roadhouse built along Jackson Avenue in the 1850s for visitors to the Fashion Course in nearby Corona has also been cited as the source of the neighborhood name. The surrounding area was annexed to Long Island City when that city was incorporated in 1870 and consolidated into the City of Greater New York in 1898.

Beginning in September 1902, agents of the Pennsylvania Railroad quietly purchased the houses and land between Skillman Avenue and Northern Boulevard from 21st Street east to 43rd Street near Woodside. The railroad's plan for a yard at the site became public on June 2, 1903, after its protest the previous day against a proposed Sunnyside street that would have cut through the planned yards within 200 feet of the East River Tunnel portal. Long Island Rail Road president William H. Baldwin Jr. confirmed the broad outlines of the scheme to The New York Times, which described the planned terminal yards as "to be the greatest in size in the world." The broader Pennsylvania Railroad landholding in the area eventually amounted to about 600 acres (240 ha), of which the yard's as-built 192-acre (78 ha) footprint occupied a portion. Most of the colonial farmhouses on the site were demolished in 1903, including the Richard Bragaw house in July of that year. In 1907–1908, the railroad leveled an approximately 200-acre (81 ha) hill (50 to 60 feet (15 to 18 m) high) at 34th–35th Streets and used the spoil to fill more than 250 acres (100 ha) of tidal marshland at the headwaters of Dutch Kills, a tributary of Newtown Creek, to a depth of 10 to 30 feet (3.0 to 9.1 m); an estimated 2,500,000 cubic yards (1,900,000 m^{3}) of earth had been moved for the leveling and fill operation by 1909.

=== Construction (1903–1910) ===
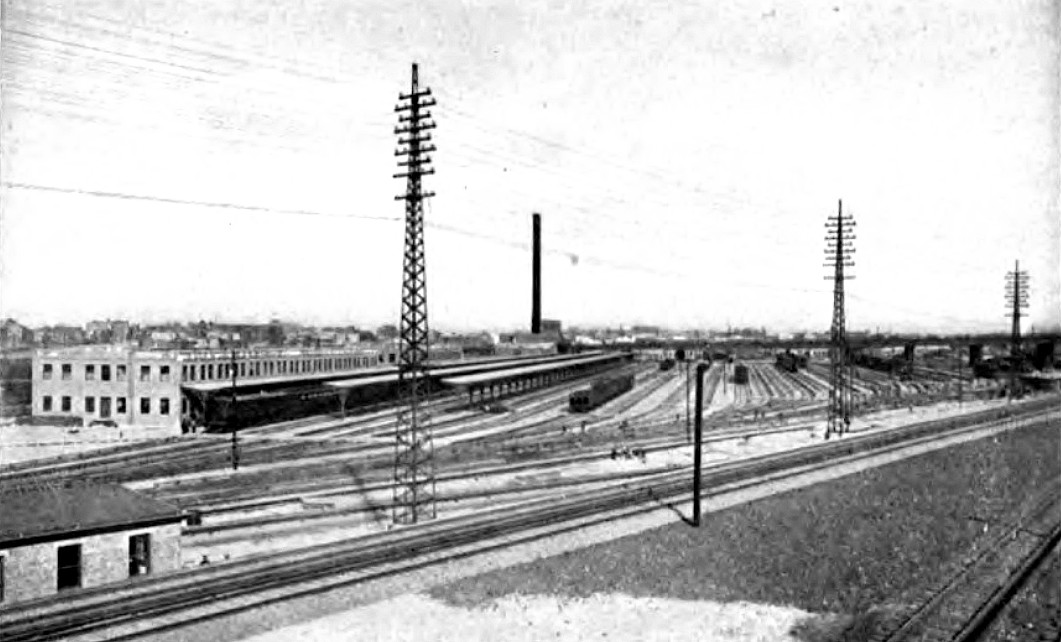
View east across the South Yard about 1910, shortly after opening

The Pennsylvania Railroad acquired the Sunnyside site as part of the New York Tunnel Extension, the broader initiative through which the PRR built Pennsylvania Station and the East River Tunnels to bring its Long Island and New England trains directly into Manhattan. The PRR's subsidiary, the Pennsylvania Tunnel and Terminal Railroad Company, was incorporated for the project. Part of the site already lay along an existing Long Island Rail Road right-of-way to the north shore, which was temporarily shifted southward during construction.

A Board of Engineers organized in January 1902 oversaw the New York Tunnel Extension; Alfred Noble served as chief engineer for the East River Division, with Louis H. Barker as resident engineer for Sunnyside Yard. The New York City Board of Estimate formally approved the yard plan on February 15, 1907, alongside the contract authorizing the New York Connecting Railroad; The New York Times described the project that May as "the largest electric car yard in the world." Excavation, contracted to the Degnon Realty and Terminal Improvement Company under resident engineer Waldo C. Briggs, began in December 1906 and was completed in late 1909; track laying was finished about a year later. Approximately 3,000,000 cubic yards (2,300,000 m^{3}) of earth were moved using steam shovels and construction trains, with six street viaducts, two under-grade crossings, and seven concrete-and-steel railroad bridges constructed within the yard.

The yard was built from the start as an electric facility, served by a power station in Long Island City opposite 34th Street that had been in operation since 1905, when the Long Island Rail Road electrified its Atlantic Avenue branch. All electric generation, substation equipment, and locomotive and multiple-unit motive power for the New York Tunnel Extension was supplied by the Westinghouse Electric & Manufacturing Company. Every yard track was third-rail equipped to allow trains to be moved by electric locomotives without steam, and concrete trenches between alternate tracks carried air, water, steam, and battery-charging conduits to each car on each track. Throughout the yard and the connecting tunnel approaches, switches, automatic stops, and semaphore signals were operated by an electro-pneumatic system supplied by the Union Switch & Signal Company and controlled from eleven cabins housing 516 working levers, four of them within Sunnyside Yard. Service buildings, designed by the Pennsylvania Tunnel and Terminal Railroad Company's engineering staff under Noble and George Gibbs and constructed by the John W. Ferguson Company of Paterson, New Jersey, included an Inspection Building and Machine Shop (160 by 71 ft (49 by 22 m)), a Boiler House and Sub-station (253 by 50 ft (77 by 15 m)), a Stores and Commissary Building (258 by 67 ft (79 by 20 m)) for Pullman and dining-car supplies, a Battery Repair Building, an Oil and Lamp House, and additional storage and Pullman cleaning sheds. Track laying was completed about a year after the December 1909 finish of excavation, in time for the September 8, 1910 opening of the East River Tunnels for Long Island Rail Road service into Pennsylvania Station; through service via the Hudson River Tunnels followed at midnight on the night of November 26–27, 1910, when the first regular train departed at 12:02 A.M.

Factories surrounded the yard. On the south side, the Degnon Terminal industrial district included businesses served by rail siding, among them the American Chicle Company chewing gum factory, the Eveready Battery Company battery factory, and the Loose-Wiles Biscuit Company (Sunshine Biscuits) factory. Adjacent to the Degnon district, the Swingline stapler factory occupied a 160,000-square-foot (15,000 m^{2}) building at 32-01 Queens Boulevard from 1951 until production was relocated to Mexico in 1999. To the immediate south of the yard, the City Housing Corporation purchased a 77-acre (31 ha) tract from the Pennsylvania Railroad in 1924 to develop the Sunnyside Gardens planned community (1924–1928), one of the earliest American garden suburbs. The City Housing Corporation, founded by Alexander M. Bing and modeled on England's Letchworth and Welwyn Garden City limited-dividend companies, opened the first 128-unit phase in November 1924 with Clarence Stein as chief architect; The New York Times reported the corporation had acquired 1,100 lots projected to house roughly 700 families.

=== Pennsylvania Railroad era (1910–1968) ===
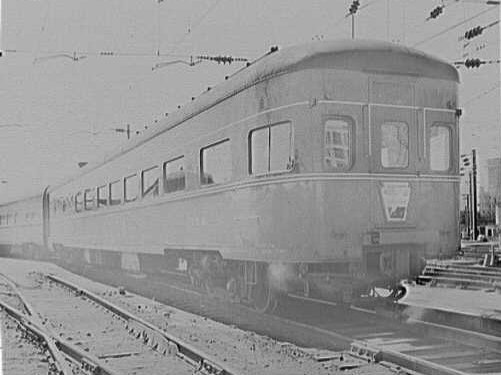
Observation car of the Pennsylvania Railroad's Jeffersonian at Sunnyside Yard, May 1948

After completion, Sunnyside Yard served as the principal storage and servicing facility for Pennsylvania Railroad trains operating into and out of Pennsylvania Station via the East River Tunnels. The yard accommodated cleaning, inspection, and turning of long-distance trains between runs; in its early years, Pullman cars accounted for about 40 percent of the equipment handled. As built, the 33rd Street tubes of the East River Tunnels were assigned to LIRR trains and the 32nd Street tubes to PRR moves to and from Sunnyside. Other carriers also worked into the yard via Penn Station. By 1940, Lehigh Valley Railroad trains were operating through the East River Tunnels to Sunnyside, a practice that became the subject of a National Railroad Adjustment Board ruling on crew pay. In 1928, the Pennsylvania Railroad established a training school and dietetical kitchen at the yard for its dining car stewards, cooks, and waiters, the third such school after similar facilities in Columbus and Chicago.

The yard was electrified on 650-volt DC third rail as built. On January 16, 1933, the Pennsylvania Railroad completed AC electrification of its main line between New Brunswick and Trenton, permitting the first long-distance electric service between New York and Philadelphia; 11,000-volt AC overhead catenary replaced the third rail between Sunnyside and Manhattan Transfer, while DC third rail was retained between Sunnyside and the Bergen tunnel portal for the LIRR and other trains. The change allowed electric locomotives to run through Sunnyside and Pennsylvania Station, and over the following months the steam locomotive change for trains continuing beyond Philadelphia was moved westward from Manhattan Transfer to Wilmington for trains to Washington and to Paoli for trains toward Pittsburgh, so that by April 1933 no long-distance passenger trains were hauled by steam east of Philadelphia.

The yard saw recurring labor unrest in its early decades, much of it concentrated at the Honeywell Street viaduct overlooking the tracks. In January 1911, just two months after the yard opened, more than 100 strikers raided the grounds in a heavy fog, firing into the air to frighten the "several hundred porters and car cleaners" at work; about fifteen were arrested at the viaduct on rioting charges. A strike by the yard's car cleaners turned violent in November 1915, when about fifty male and female strikers clashed with police at the same viaduct over the arrest of a striker who had tried to prevent a strikebreaker from returning to work; seven were arrested, and a Pennsylvania Railroad special patrolman had been killed by a westbound electric train earlier in the strike. During the nationwide 1922 railroad shopmen's strike, pickets stoned buildings and Pullman cars from the overhead viaducts; after women were reported smuggling stones onto the viaducts in baby carriages, police barred carriages from the walkways and required pedestrians to keep to the road's center. The Pennsylvania Railroad housed Black workers brought in as strikebreakers in yard buildings, where they overhauled Pullman cars.

Both railroads used the yard. The LIRR's trackage agreement with the PRR over the Sunnyside Yard tracks and East River Tunnels was the subject of an unsuccessful challenge by the New York Transit Commission and the State of New York; in Transit Commission v. United States, the Supreme Court affirmed in April 1933 that such joint-use arrangements fell under federal Interstate Commerce Commission jurisdiction rather than state regulation. The LIRR sold its ownership share of the yard on September 29, 1961, and continues to maintain a right-of-way through it. New York State purchased the LIRR itself from the Pennsylvania Railroad in 1966.

In the predawn hours of April 15, 1945, Franklin D. Roosevelt's funeral train passed through Sunnyside Yard en route from Pennsylvania Station to Hyde Park via the Hell Gate Bridge. Robert Klara's history of the funeral train describes the wartime yard as "alive with activity," with the Pennsylvania Railroad having "marshaled virtually anything that rolled," including coaches, troop sleepers, and freight cars converted to passenger use, to accommodate the 109 million passengers who passed through Pennsylvania Station in 1945.

=== Penn Central, Conrail, and Amtrak (1968–present) ===
The Pennsylvania Railroad merged with the New York Central Railroad on February 1, 1968, to form Penn Central. Following Penn Central's bankruptcy, the United States Railway Association's 1975 Final System Plan identified Sunnyside Yard, in conjunction with Penn Station, as a major passenger shop facility for "running repairs to 'G' locomotives, Metroliner coaches and commuter cars," and proposed a new shop to handle existing equipment and Amtrak's then-planned turbo trains. Under the 3R Act, Amtrak assumed the maintenance-of-equipment workforce at Penn Station and Sunnyside Yard on February 11, 1976, as part of a phased takeover of former Penn Central passenger operations. Property ownership of the yard passed to Conrail on April 1, 1976; the same day, Conrail conveyed Sunnyside as part of the broader Northeast Corridor designation to Amtrak for $87 million payable over eight years. NJ Transit and the LIRR remain the principal additional operators using the yard.

In April 2017, an NJ Transit derailment caused by a weakened wooden tie at Penn Station's "A" Interlocking, west of Sunnyside Yard, initiated an emergency Amtrak track-replacement program. The MTA cancelled or diverted 26 LIRR PM-rush trains away from Penn Station to Hunterspoint Avenue (on the southern edge of Sunnyside Yard) and to Atlantic Terminal in Brooklyn.

In 2025, Amtrak began a modernization of Sunnyside Yard, one of three Northeast Corridor rail yards it contracted to rebuild in a program valued at about $2.6 billion. Amtrak described the three-yard work as part of its broader fleet-modernization program, funded through the federal Infrastructure Investment and Jobs Act. A Scalamandre–Citnalta joint venture received notice to proceed in June 2025 on the Sunnyside work, which an Amtrak spokesperson valued at about $1.3 billion. The project is to add a new two-track maintenance-and-inspection facility and six service-and-cleaning tracks under canopy, bring the yard's eleven existing service platforms to a state of good repair, and reconfigure two major interlockings and the tracks connecting the yard to the Northeast Corridor, with the phased work scheduled for completion in 2030. Amtrak described the upgrades as needed to service its new Airo trainsets, which it planned to introduce on the Northeast Corridor beginning in 2027. Construction on the maintenance-and-inspection facility began in late August 2026.

The East River Tunnels linking the yard to Penn Station carry more than 450 Amtrak, LIRR, and NJ Transit trains on a typical day. Two of the tunnels' four tubes were damaged by floodwaters during Superstorm Sandy in 2012; in 2024 Amtrak began an approximately $1.6 billion rehabilitation of those tubes, funded largely by a $1.26 billion federal grant, closing one tube at a time and staging preparatory work in Sunnyside Yard, with construction expected to run through 2027.

== Operations ==
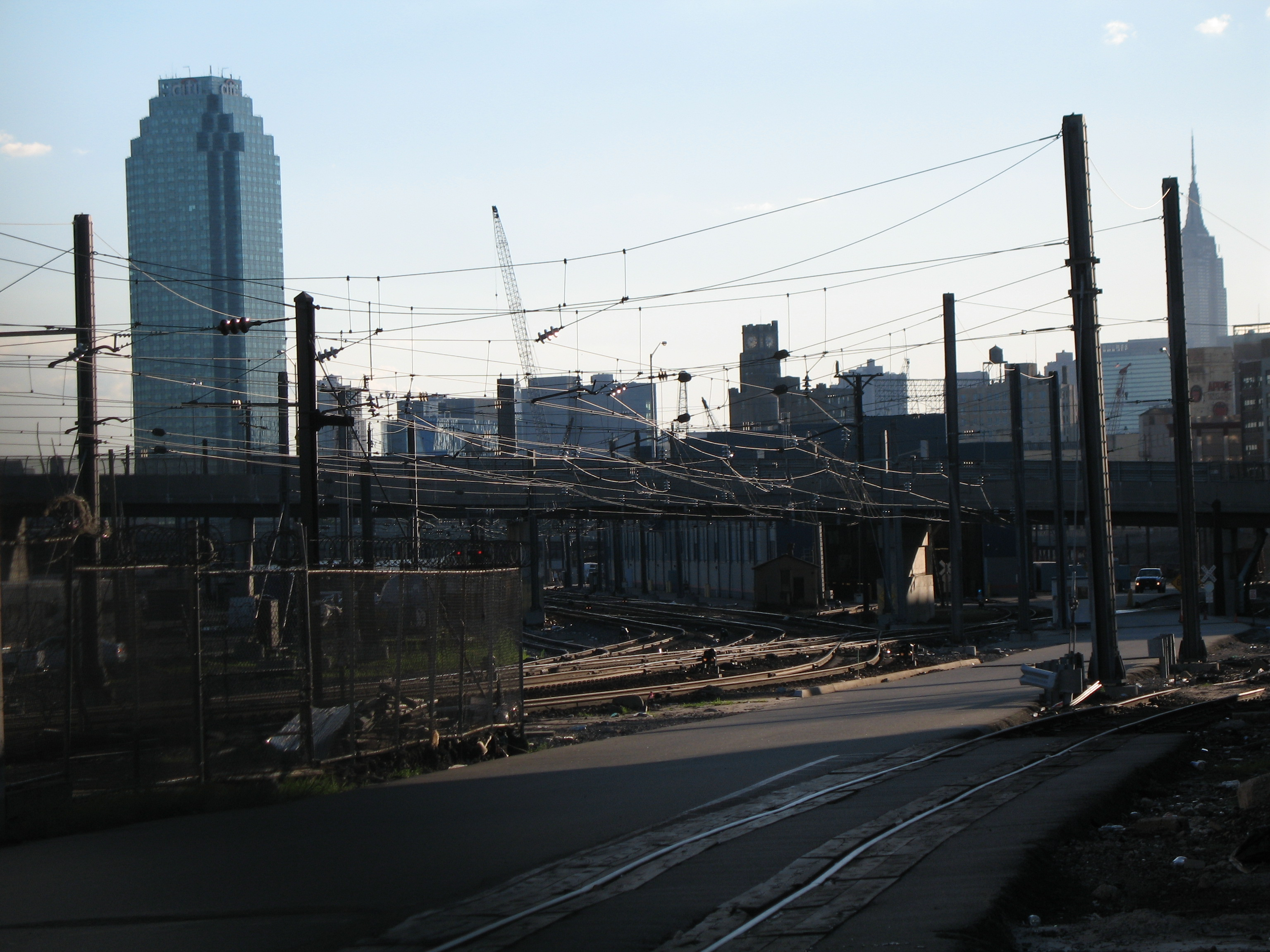
The yard at dusk from the east; One Court Square (formerly the Citigroup Building) in background at left

The yard is used principally for the storage, servicing, cleaning, and turning of long-distance and commuter passenger trains operating into Pennsylvania Station. Amtrak, New Jersey Transit, and the Long Island Rail Road all use the yard. New Jersey Transit parks trainsets that terminate at Penn Station there during off-peak hours.

=== Harold Interlocking ===
Harold Interlocking, a 14-track junction located at the yard's eastern end, was created in 1910 to handle East River Tunnel traffic at the opening of Pennsylvania Station and was named that year for Harold Avenue, since renamed 39th Avenue. As of 2012, it was the busiest rail junction in the United States, handling roughly 600 commuter trains and 48 Amtrak trains daily, all directed since the mid-1990s from a centralized computer control post in Pennsylvania Station. In connection with the East Side Access project, the interlocking's lead designer put its traffic at more than 750 trains a day operated by four railroads and described it as the busiest interlocking in North America. The interlocking governs movements among Amtrak's Northeast Corridor (continuing east via the Hell Gate Line toward New England), the LIRR Main Line (continuing east into Long Island), and trains entering or leaving the yard. The interlocking's complexity and high traffic volume have produced frequent delays and occasional accidents. On July 23, 1984, two Amtrak trains traveling on the same northbound track collided head-on at about 10:45 a.m. on the Hell Gate Line viaduct in Astoria, just east of Harold Interlocking, after the southbound track had been temporarily closed for catenary maintenance; one passenger was killed and 125 were injured. On March 19, 1990, a freight tank car carrying 33,000 gallons of liquid propane derailed inside the yard where the tracks pass under Queens Boulevard and the IRT Flushing Line viaduct; out of concern that the cargo could ignite, the Fire Department ordered electrical power to nearby subway and railroad tracks shut off for several hours, halting service on the 7, E, F, N, R, and G subway routes and stranding tens of thousands of commuters; service was restored shortly after midnight, with no leaks or injuries reported. Weeks later, on the first night of Passover in 1990, a power surge left thousands of LIRR commuters stranded at Harold; the LIRR subsequently replaced the switching system at the interlocking over the summer of 1990.

In May 2011, a $294.7 million federal grant was awarded to address congestion at Harold Interlocking. The reconstruction provided dedicated tracks to the Hell Gate Line for Amtrak trains arriving from or bound for New England, allowing them to bypass NJ Transit and LIRR traffic. By 2018, the MTA had replaced the interlocking's signal system with a microprocessor-based system. Cost overruns attributed in part to coordination problems between the MTA and Amtrak contributed to the rising cost of the broader East Side Access program, which reached about $11.2 billion by April 2018. By early 2023, some of the interlocking improvements were complete, with remaining work scheduled for late 2025.

=== East Side Access ===
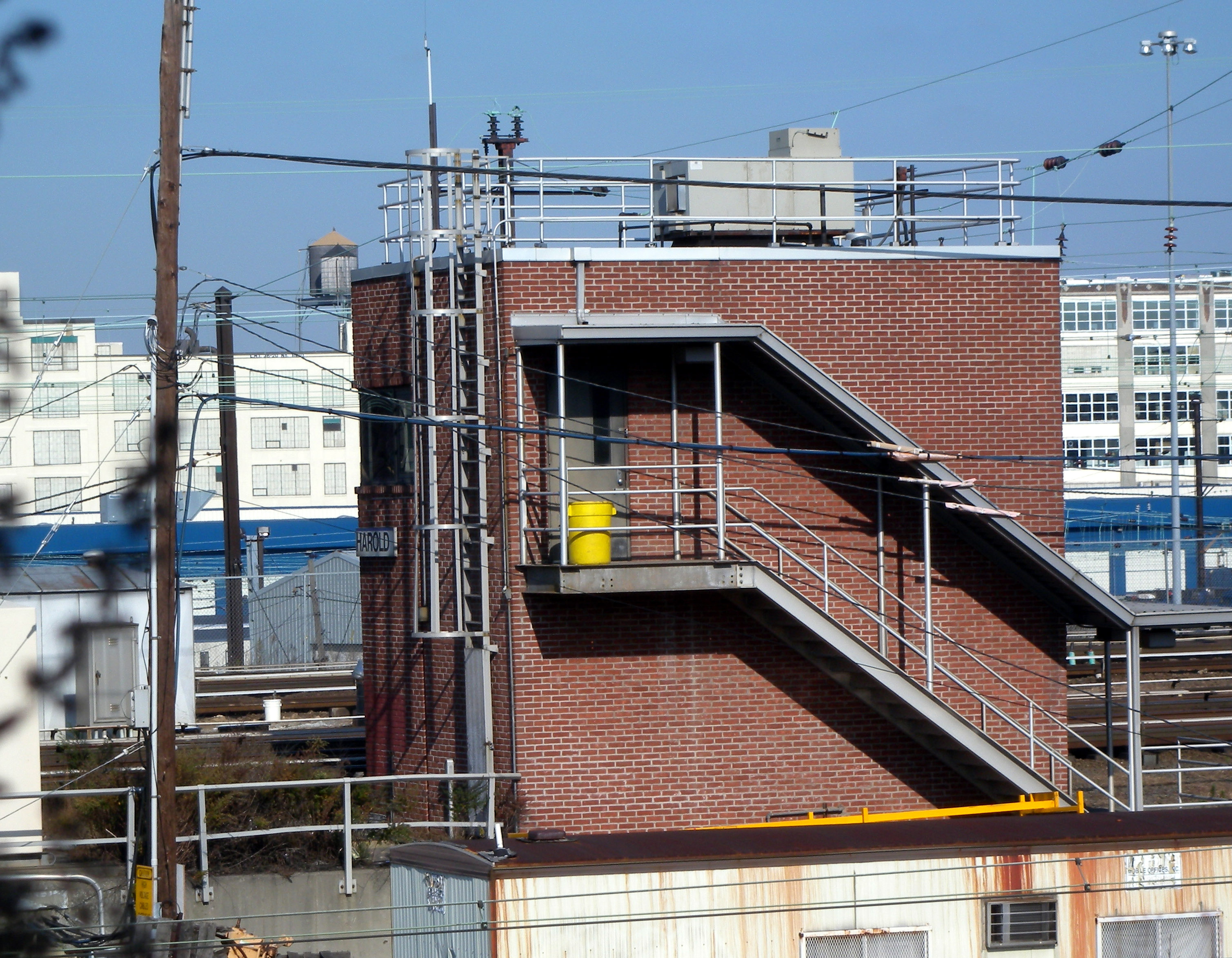
Harold Tower, from which the main line alongside the yard was formerly controlled

As part of the East Side Access project, which created a new LIRR terminal at Grand Central Madison (opened January 25, 2023), some LIRR trains diverge from the Main Line and travel through the 63rd Street Tunnel and four bored tunnels beneath Sunnyside Yard to reach Grand Central Madison. These tunnels, between 20 and 70 feet (6.1 and 21.3 m) below the surface, connect the existing 63rd Street tunnel to the LIRR Main Line. The project also constructed a 33-acre (13 ha) Mid Day Storage Yard within Sunnyside Yard at Harold Interlocking, for storing LIRR trainsets, under a prime construction contract awarded to Tutor Perini with a final value of about $351 million.

=== Penn Station Access ===
Penn Station Access is an MTA project to extend Metro-North Railroad service from the Bronx into Penn Station via the Hell Gate Line, with four new ADA-accessible stations in the eastern Bronx (Hunts Point, Parkchester/Van Nest, Morris Park, and Co-op City). Governor Kathy Hochul led a groundbreaking ceremony on December 9, 2022; the design-build contract was awarded to a Halmar International–RailWorks joint venture in December 2021, and the MTA projected the total project cost at $3.18 billion (following a 2022 capital-plan amendment that included expansion of the New Rochelle Yard), with a $500 million Amtrak contribution and an originally planned 2027 service date. The project requires substantial work at Harold Interlocking, including a Westbound Bypass routing Metro-North trains through the yard area, plus 3 miles (4.8 km) of new third rail and two new DC substations.

In October 2025, the MTA reported that Amtrak had delivered only 7 of 48 promised track outages, pushing full completion of Penn Station Access to 2030, with three of the four Bronx stations potentially still opening in 2027. The New York Times reported in 2026 that city officials had considered creating a new passenger rail station at the yard since at least 2018, but the MTA had opposed the proposal in recent years on cost grounds.

== Environmental remediation ==
Decades of railroad operations at Sunnyside Yard left contamination including polychlorinated biphenyls (PCBs), semivolatile organic compounds (SVOCs), polycyclic aromatic hydrocarbons (PAHs), lead, and petroleum hydrocarbons. PCB contamination has been attributed in part to losses from train-mounted transformers, while the petroleum plume in the yard's north-central area has been linked to nine former underground fuel-oil storage tanks at the site of the former Engine House (Operable Unit 3), excavated as part of remediation. The yard was added to the New York State Department of Environmental Conservation (NYSDEC) Registry of Inactive Hazardous Waste Disposal Sites as a Class 2 site in the 1980s; under NYSDEC oversight, the site (#241006) has been divided into six operable units covering soil, separate-phase petroleum hydrocarbons, and the yard's sewer system. A 1996 cleanup program removed PCB-contaminated sediment from impacted sewer manholes. Separate-phase petroleum hydrocarbons in the roughly 8-acre (3.2 ha) north-central area (Operable Unit 3) were addressed through a phased series of interim remedial measures, including a recovery trench, recovery wells, and an interceptor trench with sumps.

Amtrak and the Long Island Rail Road have also been named among 27 potentially responsible parties for the Newtown Creek Superfund site, whose final addition to the National Priorities List was announced by the EPA on September 27, 2010. City Limits reported in March 2020 that the yard's hazardous-waste status was among the concerns raised by community groups during NYCEDC's master-planning process; the Justice for All Coalition criticized the engagement process for marginalizing residents of the adjacent Queensbridge Houses NYCHA development.

== Air-rights and development proposals ==
A series of proposals dating to the 1920s have envisioned constructing a deck over Sunnyside Yard to support residential, commercial, and open-space development; none had advanced to construction as of 2026. The roughly 180-acre (73 ha) yard is about a mile and a half long. The 2020 master plan characterized it as a "publicly controlled site" about six times the size of the Hudson Yards development and as "the most important undeveloped public site in the heart of the most diverse region in the United States." According to the New York City Economic Development Corporation, Amtrak completed a major infrastructure upgrade of the yard in 2014, which the agency cited as creating an opportunity to consider extending neighborhoods over the rail facility. Such proposals have been compared with the analogous Hudson Yards development built over Manhattan's West Side Yard. The deck envisioned at Sunnyside would be more than four times the size of the platform built over Hudson Yards.

=== Earlier proposals (1925–2015) ===
In October 1925, the State Transit Commission's chief executive officer Philip Mathews and Commissioner LeRoy Harkness proposed building a new suburban railroad terminal in Sunnyside Yard to relieve congestion at Pennsylvania Station and Grand Central Terminal. The plan would have diverted a portion of Long Island Rail Road, New Haven, and Westchester & Boston commuter trains to the new terminal, routing New England trains in via the Hell Gate Bridge and the New York Connecting Railroad and connecting the terminal to the BMT and IRT elevated lines at Queensboro Plaza by a 0.4-mile (0.64 km) spur. Mathews estimated the project would cost about $7 million, take twelve months to build, and add 22,000 rush-hour seats. The plan envisioned an office building above the terminal to offset costs, but the New Haven and Westchester railroads objected to the Hell Gate Bridge diversion; in November 1925 the commission agreed to proceed with an LIRR-only version of the terminal with engineering led by the city's Board of Transportation, but this compromise plan was also never built. A few years later, the Regional Plan Association's First Regional Plan of 1931 envisioned a similar Sunnyside-Yard terminal, calling for "the construction of a new transportation terminal and office building... of a size that would dominate all this part of the Borough of Queens." In 1971, the New York State Urban Development Corporation reportedly developed a plan featuring 20-story apartment buildings and a shopping mall over the yard, though the plan was not advanced. In 1973, Governor Nelson Rockefeller proposed a development above the yard that would have included two racetracks and a football stadium; that proposal was likewise not advanced.

In January 1984, the New York State Urban Development Corporation (UDC) created a Sportsplex Corporation subsidiary to study sites for a professional sports complex in New York City, with developer Donald Trump (then owner of the USFL's New Jersey Generals) named to the new agency's board; Trump had already been privately scouting sites and was reported by The New York Times to be focused on three locations, including the Penn Central rail yards in Sunnyside. By March 1984, the proposed dome at Sunnyside was being criticized in the Times for the added construction cost of building on a raised platform above the rail yard and for relying on the 59th Street Bridge as the only direct car access, which would require new highways through Astoria, Maspeth, and Sunnyside. Trump's stadium proposal did not advance.

During the Bloomberg administration, the concept resurfaced again. Bloomberg promised a citywide strategic land-use plan that evolved into PlaNYC; Deputy Mayor Daniel Doctoroff commissioned a then-unreleased report that recommended decking over Sunnyside Yard among other large-scale interventions. In November 2014, Doctoroff (by then CEO of Bloomberg L.P.) published a New York Times opinion piece proposing relocation of the Jacob K. Javits Convention Center to Sunnyside Yard. The Doctoroff plan called for a 3.1-million-square-foot convention center on a deck over the rail yard, paired with roughly 14,000 housing units (about half affordable), more than two million square feet of office and retail space, hotels, public open space, and a new transit center, at an estimated cost of $8 billion based on analysis prepared for him by SHoP Architects and HR&A Advisors. Doctoroff proposed financing the platform and convention center largely through the sale of the existing Javits site, which he valued at about $4 billion, with the difference covered by incremental tax revenue from the new development. In his February 2015 State of the City address, Mayor Bill de Blasio proposed building a platform over the yard to accommodate up to 11,250 affordable housing units; within hours, Governor Andrew Cuomo's communications director Melissa DeRosa rejected the proposal, stating that the MTA used Sunnyside as "an important facility for our transportation system, and it is not available for any other use in the near term."

=== 2017 feasibility study and 2020 master plan ===
In February 2017, the NYCEDC and Amtrak released a feasibility study, prepared by FX FOWLE Architects, examining three full-yard development scenarios accommodating 14,000 to 24,000 housing units (4,200 to 7,200 affordable), and a more refined "Core Yard" scenario covering roughly 70 acres (28 ha) with 11,000 to 15,000 units (3,300 to 4,500 affordable). The study estimated total development costs of $16 billion to $19 billion (in 2017 dollars) across the full-yard scenarios. The study found that even this smaller scenario carried a negative residual land value. It estimated the Core Yard's total development cost at approximately $10 billion in 2017 dollars against about $2.84 billion in gross land proceeds, and put the Core Yard's residual land value at about -$798 million, which it said indicated that public investment would be required. In May 2018, Deputy Mayor Alicia Glen led a revival of the overbuild concept following the study, convening a 41-member steering committee of public officials, business representatives, and community leaders to develop a master plan over 18 months. The architectural firm led by Vishaan Chakrabarti was engaged to oversee the planning process. Amtrak, which owns roughly 142 of the yard's 180 acres, supported the planning effort; chairman Tony Coscia told The New York Times that the topographical challenges of the site were significant but tractable. The proposal generated significant local opposition focused on density, displacement, the affordability of units, pedestrian and road connections, open space, and proximity to a Superfund site; Melissa Orlando of the local advocacy group Access Queens, who served on the steering committee, said she had not encountered any Queens residents who supported the plan, citing concerns about housing displacement, overcrowded subway service, an overtaxed utility grid, and sewage overflow into the Newtown Creek Superfund site. A September 2019 public meeting was interrupted by protesters chanting "We Don't Trust this Process!" The Justice for All Coalition, a community group focused on environmental justice, criticized NYCEDC's outreach for marginalizing residents of the adjacent Queensbridge Houses NYCHA development and argued that the plan would not meet community needs. In November 2019, U.S. Representative Alexandria Ocasio-Cortez and Council Member Jimmy Van Bramer sent a joint letter to the NYCEDC raising concerns about the project. In January 2020, Ocasio-Cortez resigned from the project's steering committee, citing concerns about the planning process and community input.

In March 2020, NYCEDC and Amtrak released the Sunnyside Yard Master Plan, calling for a deck over the yard supporting 12,000 housing units (all designated as affordable housing), 60 acres (24 ha) of parks and public plazas, and a proposed regional rail station. The plan also programmed ten schools, two libraries, more than 30 childcare centers, and five health-care facilities, along with 5,000,000 square feet (460,000 m^{2}) of commercial and manufacturing space. NY1 reported the plan as a roughly $14 billion proposal. The plan proposed a $14.4 billion deck covering about 80 percent of the yard. The 2017 feasibility study had found that the yard's LIRR Main Line corridor, about 15 to 20 percent of the site, could not be decked because near-constant rail activity there could not reasonably be suspended for construction. Under a "transit-first" model, the plan made a new Sunnyside Station (to be served by the LIRR and, eventually, Metro-North, with possible NJ Transit and Amtrak service) its first priority, to be built ahead of the housing, and it called for a bus rapid transit line connecting Queens to Midtown Manhattan and a possible new Queens subway line. Of the 12,000 units, half were to be rental apartments for households earning under 50 percent of area median income (half of those under 30 percent), and half affordable-homeownership units modeled on the Mitchell-Lama Housing Program. The plan went largely dormant during the pandemic and the de Blasio administration's final years; Gotham Gazette reported in September 2022 that progress had stalled.

Constructing a deck over the active rail yard posed significant engineering challenges. The MTA recorded the subsurface as "a mixture of sand, clay and boulders" with a high water table, and because the site varies in elevation, any platform would have to undulate to fit the surrounding neighborhoods' topography. As reported in 2015, a deck of up to 8,000,000 square feet (740,000 m^{2}) would be required, and the decking alone would take decades, in what could be a 30-year project, with about half the cost incurred in the first five years. For the 2020 master plan, the structural engineer Thornton Tomasetti developed design criteria for a platform spanning as much as 80 percent of the roughly 184 acres (74 ha) site. Rather than placing building foundations between the tracks, as earlier proposals had, that plan separated the structural support for the deck from the support for the buildings placed on top.

=== Mamdani revival (2026) ===
On February 26, 2026, Mayor Zohran Mamdani met with President Donald Trump at the White House to seek federal investment in the Sunnyside Yard project; during the Oval Office meeting, Mamdani presented Trump with two Daily News front pages, an authentic reproduction of the 1975 "Ford to City: Drop Dead" cover and a mock-up bearing the headline "Trump to City: Let's Build" announcing a "New Era of Housing." Mamdani's tweet of the event drew 28.5 million views. The revived proposal called for roughly $21 billion in federal funds to build the deck and 12,000 affordable homes, of which 6,000 would be modeled on the Mitchell-Lama Housing Program as cooperative and subsidized ownership units. Mamdani estimated the development would create 30,000 union jobs and described the project at a February 27, 2026 news conference as "the largest rail deck the world has ever seen." AmNewYork framed his federal pitch in opposition to the Ford-era "Drop Dead" period of federal disinvestment from New York. A spokeswoman for Governor Kathy Hochul signaled tentative support; an Amtrak spokesman declined to comment, and the White House declined The New York Times 's requests for comment.

Reactions to the revived proposal were mixed. Council Member Julie Won, who represents the area, called the proposal "a failed housing project" and convened an April 2026 town hall at Sunnyside Community Services that drew nearly 200 residents; attendee responses at the town hall were roughly divided among support, opposition, and those wanting more information. Queens Community Board 2 chair Anatole Ashraf told the Queens Daily Eagle the proposal "came out of left field" with no prior community-board presentations. Queens Borough President Donovan Richards said he was "excited about the proposition" of restarting the project but called for a "robust community engagement process" before it advanced. Brooklyn Borough President Antonio Reynoso expressed reservations about relying on Trump-administration commitments, citing the long-stalled Gateway tunnel project.

Supporters included Ocasio-Cortez, whose spokeswoman characterized the federal investment as potentially "transformational" while reserving judgment on plan details. Carlo Scissura, president of the New York Building Congress and a former member of the de Blasio-era Sunnyside Yard task force, said he was "over the moon" at Trump's apparent receptivity. Alicia Glen, who had led the 2018 master-planning effort as Deputy Mayor, called the announcement "directionally positive" but warned that requirements for fully affordable housing and union construction would make the financing "untenable unless [federal funders] throw the entire budget at it." Crain's New York Business described the deck plan as gaining "steam under Mamdani." Writing in The Nation, columnist D. D. Guttenplan argued that Mamdani's "theatrics" had backfired by reinforcing Trump's image as a strongman commanding deference. In a City Limits op-ed, planners Cali Williams and Jack Robbins argued for smaller, terra-firma development on adjacent sites such as the Skillman Avenue and Arch Street Yards as a faster, less costly alternative to constructing a multibillion-dollar deck.

== In popular culture ==
Director James Gray's 2000 crime drama The Yards is set in the Sunnyside neighborhood and revolves around a fictional New York City Transit Authority rail-car repair yard. Jack Houghteling's 2023 novel Sunnyside makes a passing reference to the yard's rail cut, describing a character "running the train-cut plain between Sunnyside Gardens and Cavalry Cemetery."

== See also ==
- Hudson Yards (development)
- List of railroad yards in New York City
- New York Connecting Railroad
- New York Tunnel Extension
- West Side Yard

== Sources ==
- Bibel, George (2012). Train Wreck: The Forensics of Rail Disasters. Johns Hopkins University Press. ISBN 978-1-4214-0652-7.
- Hazelton, Henry Isham, ed. (1925). The Boroughs of Brooklyn and Queens, Counties of Nassau and Suffolk, Long Island, New York, 1609-1924. New York: Lewis Historical Publishing Co.
- Couper, William, ed. (1912). History of the Engineering, Construction and Equipment of the Pennsylvania Railroad Company's New York Terminal and Approaches. New York: Isaac H. Blanchard Co.
- Jackson, Kenneth T. (2010). The Encyclopedia of New York City (2nd ed.). New Haven: Yale University Press. ISBN 978-0-300-11465-2.
- Klara, Robert (2010). FDR's Funeral Train: A Betrayed Widow, a Soviet Spy, and a Presidency in the Balance. Palgrave Macmillan. ISBN 978-0-230-10803-5.
- Morrison, David D.; Quigley, Stephen F. (2016). Sunnyside Yard and Hell Gate Bridge. Images of Rail. Arcadia Publishing. ISBN 978-1-4671-2419-5.
- Seyfried, Vincent F. (1984). 300 Years of Long Island City, 1630–1930. Long Island City, New York: Edgian Press.
