= Harlem River Yards =

Waterfront industrial property in New York City

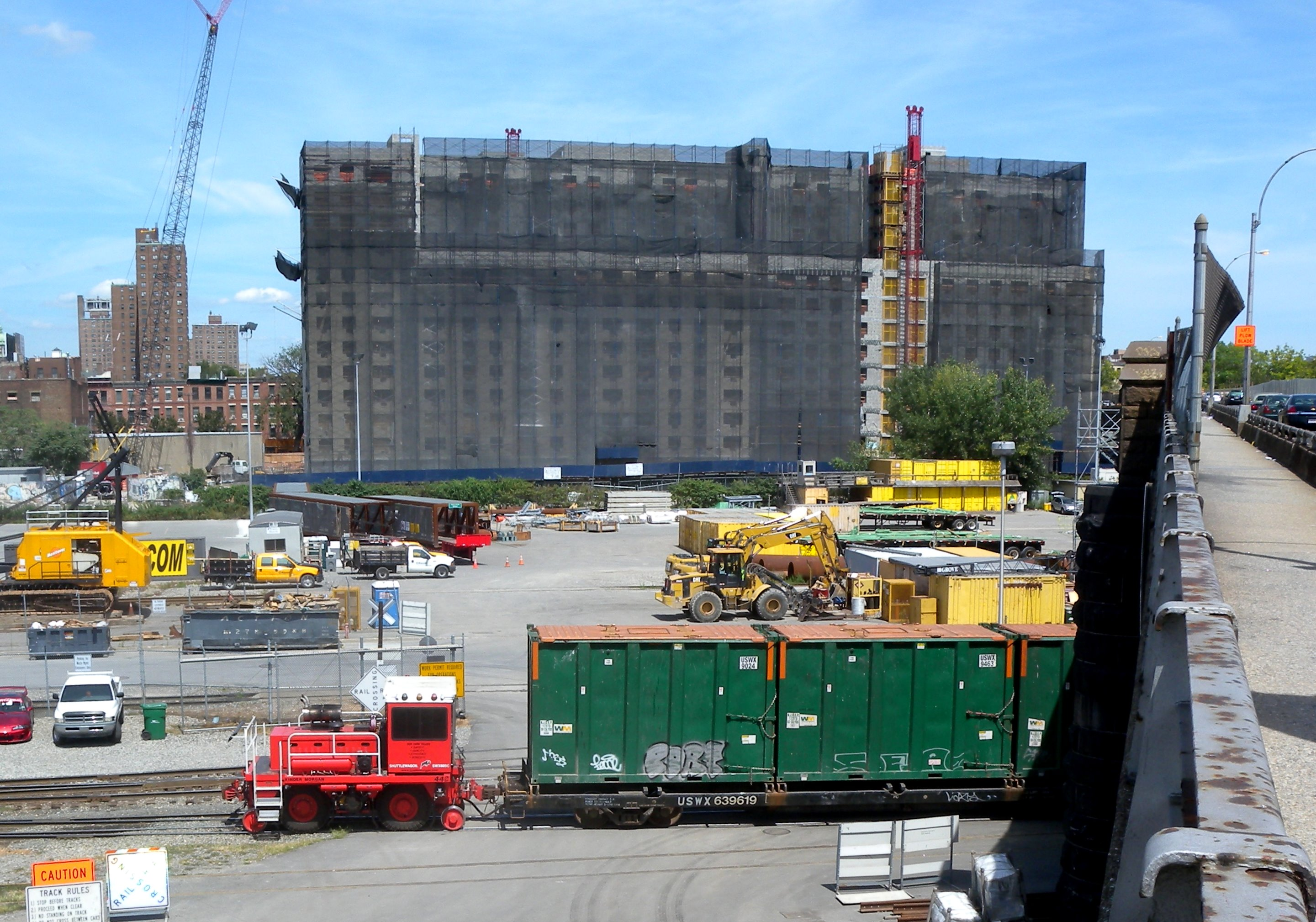
- Car with solid waste containers being shunted at the Harlem River Yard
- Interactive map of Harlem River Yards

Location
- Location: The Bronx, New York
- Coordinates: 40°48′12″N 73°55′30″W

Details
- Built: 1991
- Operated by: Harlem River Yard Ventures
- Type of Harbor: dry port
- Size: 28 acres (intermodal facility); 96 acres (total)
- Rail lines: Oak Point Link
- Rail gauge: 1,435 mm (4 ft 8 1/2 in) standard gauge
- Street access: Bruckner Expressway; MD Expressway

Harlem River Yards (also known as Harlem River Yard) is a waterfront industrial property located in the Port Morris neighborhood of The Bronx in New York City. It is operated by Harlem River Yard Ventures, part of the Galesi Group, under a 99-year lease with the State of New York signed in 1991.

The yard owes its name to the property's prior and current use as a freight rail yard. However, only a 28-acre portion of the site has been retained for intermodal rail use, with rail traffic to and from the yard limited to municipal solid waste shipment. Beginning in the late 1990s, Harlem River Yards has been the site of substantial commercial development, including a New York Post printing plant, a waste treatment plant, and a FedEx distribution center.

== History ==
Harlem River Yards was a 96-acre freight rail yard owned by the Penn Central Railroad, which in turn acquired the yard and associated lines in 1969 when it consummated a regulatory-induced, forced merger with the New Haven Railroad. When the Penn Central went into bankruptcy in the 1970s, the State of New York condemned the rail yard and placed it under the stewardship of the state's Department of Transportation. The yards were a key component of New York's Full Freight Access Program, a multi-decade effort to create manufacturing jobs by modernizing rail freight transportation in New York City and Long Island. This project involved raising vertical clearance on the rail lines along the east shore of the Hudson River from the Albany area into New York City and Long Island to accommodate Trailer on Flatcar (TOFC) intermodal freight transport, and the construction of the Oak Point Link. However, efforts to develop an intermodal rail facility at Harlem River Yards were frustrated due to multiple factors, including a lack of commercial interest and shifting political priorities. The Oak Point Link finally opened in 1998, but connected to a small intermodal facility at Harlem River Yards which used a small 28-acre portion of the site.

In 1991, the State of New York entered into a 99-year lease agreement with Harlem River Yard Ventures, a subsidiary of the Galesi Group, to develop and operate Harlem River Yards as a mixed-use industrial park. Harlem River Yard Ventures proceeded with industrial development of Harlem River Yards, with a New York Post paper printing and distribution facility built on the site in 1998, and FedEx distribution facility built on the site in 2007.

In 2012, online grocery retailer FreshDirect proposed moving its main food distribution hub from Long Island City in Queens to the Harlem River Yards. Bronx Borough President Rubén Díaz, Jr. has said that he expects the new FreshDirect facility to create roughly 1,000 jobs in the Bronx over the next decade. However, some residents in the South Bronx protested the development and organized efforts to promote conversion of the Harlem River Yards into a park space. A lawsuit brought by a South Bronx advocacy group challenged the environmental review process for the FreshDirect facility, and also attempted to void the lease of the Harlem River Yards property to Harlem River Yard Ventures as well as Harlem River Yard Ventures' sublease of land to FreshDirect. This lawsuit was ultimately dismissed by unanimous appellate decision in 2014. Construction on FreshDirect's Harlem River Yards facility began in December 2014.

In 2016, the Empire State Development invited interested developers to design residential projects above the 13-acre south Bronx rail yard and its train station. In April 2018, The Athletic leaked that The Related Companies and Somerset Partners had submitted plans to build a mixed-use complex above the rail yard adjacent to the Willis Avenue Bridge. The development is planned to contain 1,779 apartments and a 26,000-seat stadium for New York City FC. In 2023, a small group of local residents publicly opposed the 5-year permit renewal of the nearby natural gas-powered plant, citing air quality as a priority for the residential development of the area.

== See also ==
- Hudson Yards, a commercial and residential redevelopment project in Manhattan
- Pacific Park, formerly "Atlantic Yards", a commercial redevelopment project in Brooklyn
