= Fresh Pond Junction =

Railroad yard in New York City

Coordinates: 40°42′26″N 73°53′16″W

New York and Atlantic system map. Fresh Pond Junction is located at the top of the "J"-shaped branch, lower left.

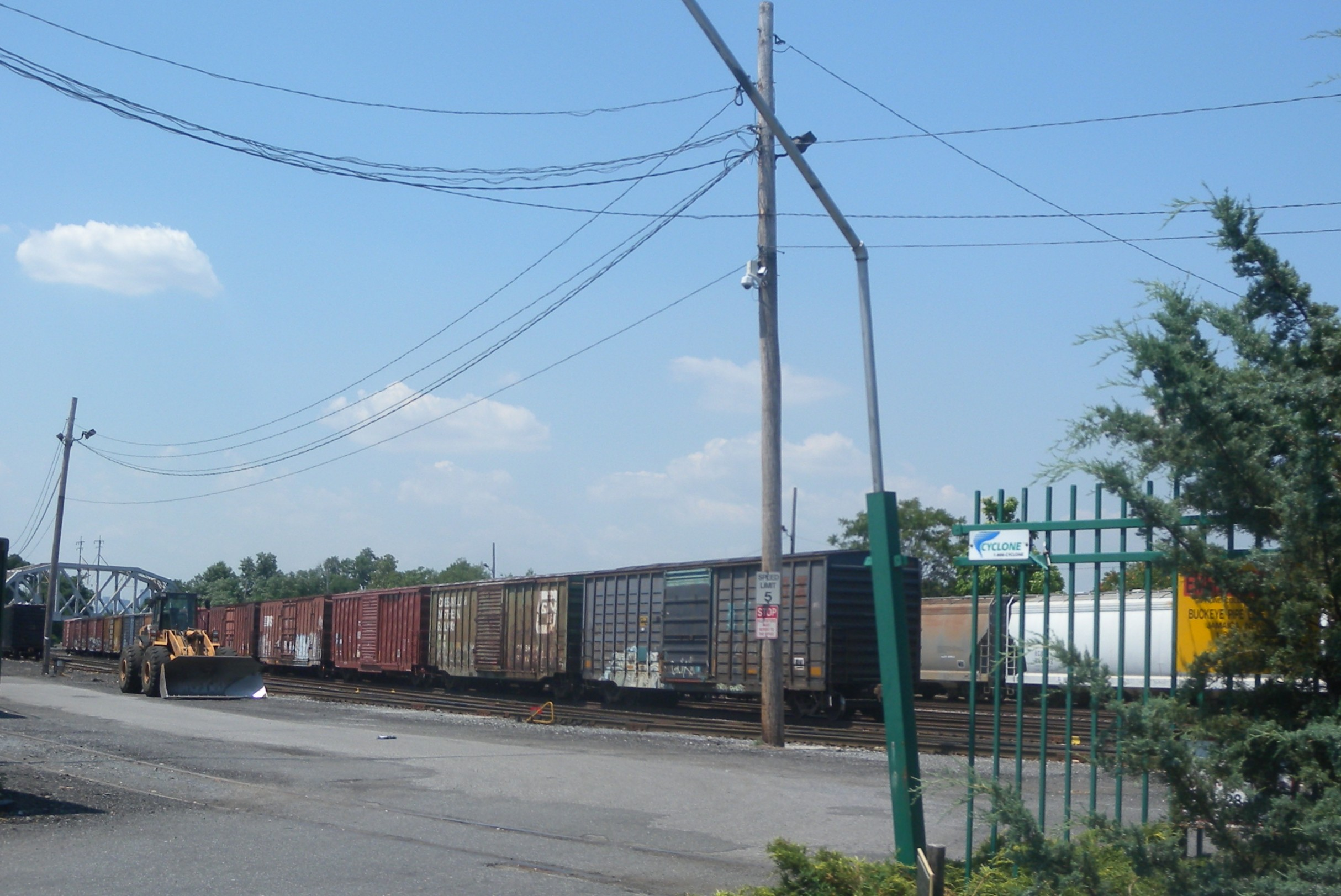
South gate

Fresh Pond Junction is a freight yard in the Ridgewood and Glendale neighborhoods of Queens in New York City. It is operated by the New York & Atlantic Railway, which serves Long Island using tracks owned by the Long Island Rail Road (LIRR). The yard has operated since the early 20th century and is the primary rail freight yard on the island.

Trains can travel from Fresh Pond Junction to the mainland in two directions:

- North via the Hell Gate Bridge and the Oak Point Yard, providing interchanges with the CSX and Providence and Worcester railroads.
- Southwest via the Bay Ridge Branch to the New York New Jersey Rail's car float operation. Barges bring cars to Greenville Yard in New Jersey, where interchange is available to CSX and Norfolk Southern Railway using Conrail's North Jersey Shared Assets Area.

The Fresh Pond Junction freight facility comprises two yards, west (5 tracks) and east (9 tracks), both of which parallel the NY&A Montauk Branch. There is also a wye and interchange tracks with the New York Connecting Railroad line (now CSX Fremont Secondary) which connects the Oak Point Yard to the Bay Ridge Branch as it passes over the yard. Nearby is Fresh Pond Yard, a separate and unconnected facility of the New York City Subway. Mafera Park, a small neighborhood park, is located at the southwestern corner of Fresh Pond Junction, bounded by the junction to the north and east and the Fresh Pond Yard to the west.

== Operations ==
CSX runs daily local yard jobs from Oak Point Yard in the Bronx to Fresh Pond, carrying manifest freight southbound and empty cars and trash loads northbound. The Providence and Worcester Railroad (P&W) brings stone and gravel southbound on their CHFP train from Cedar Hill Yard in New Haven, Connecticut, on Sunday, Tuesday, and Thursday evenings, and runs the cars back to Cedar Hill empty on their FPCH train on Monday, Wednesday, and Friday evenings. NY&A uses the yard as an interchange yard, taking the freight from the CSX and P&W trains and delivering it to destinations on Long Island or down the Bay Ridge Branch and across the Upper New York Bay via New York New Jersey Rail.
