= Oak Point Yard =

Rail yard in New York City, United States

Coordinates: 40.8108°N 73.899°W

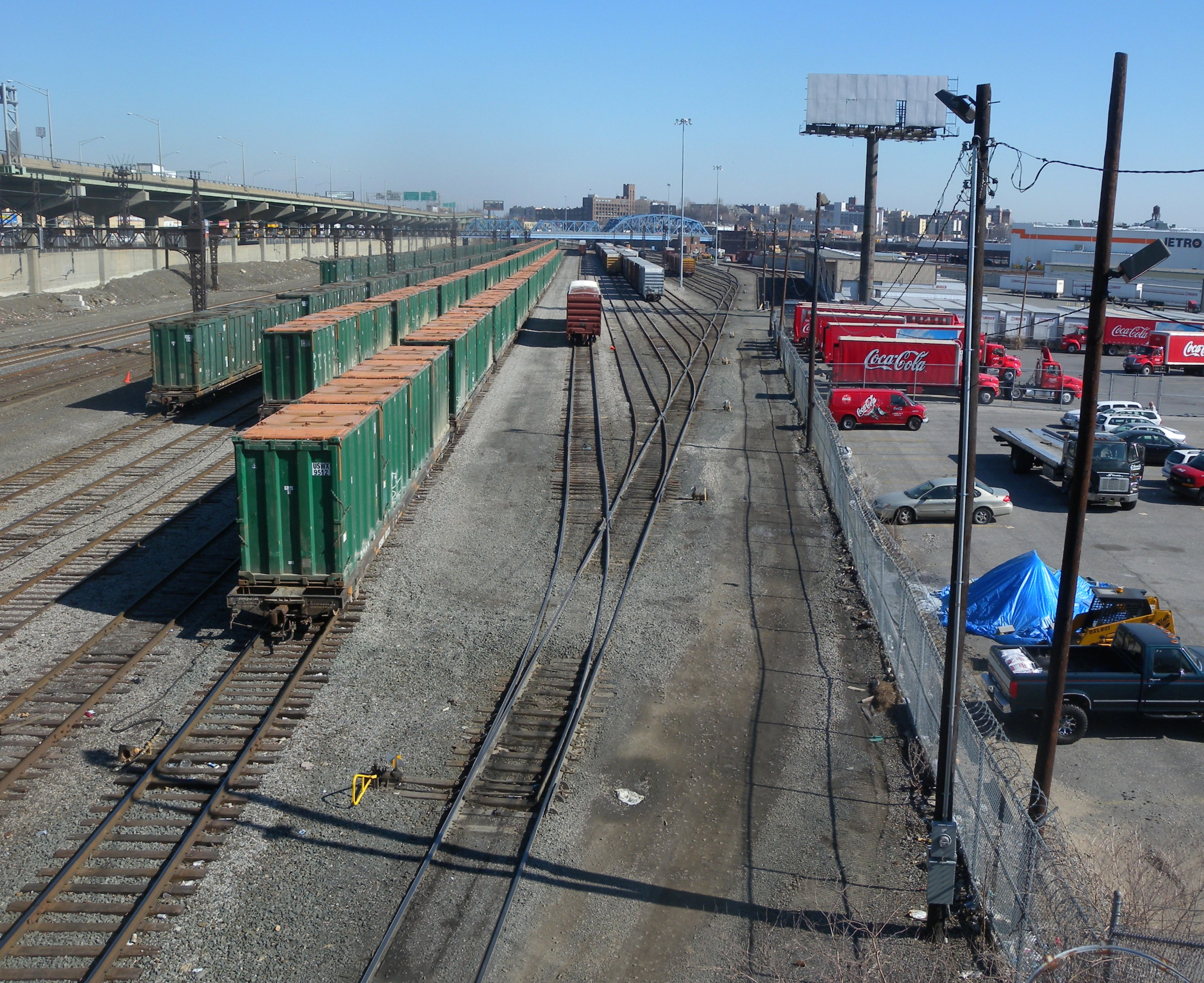
Southwestern part of yard, from 149th Street bridge

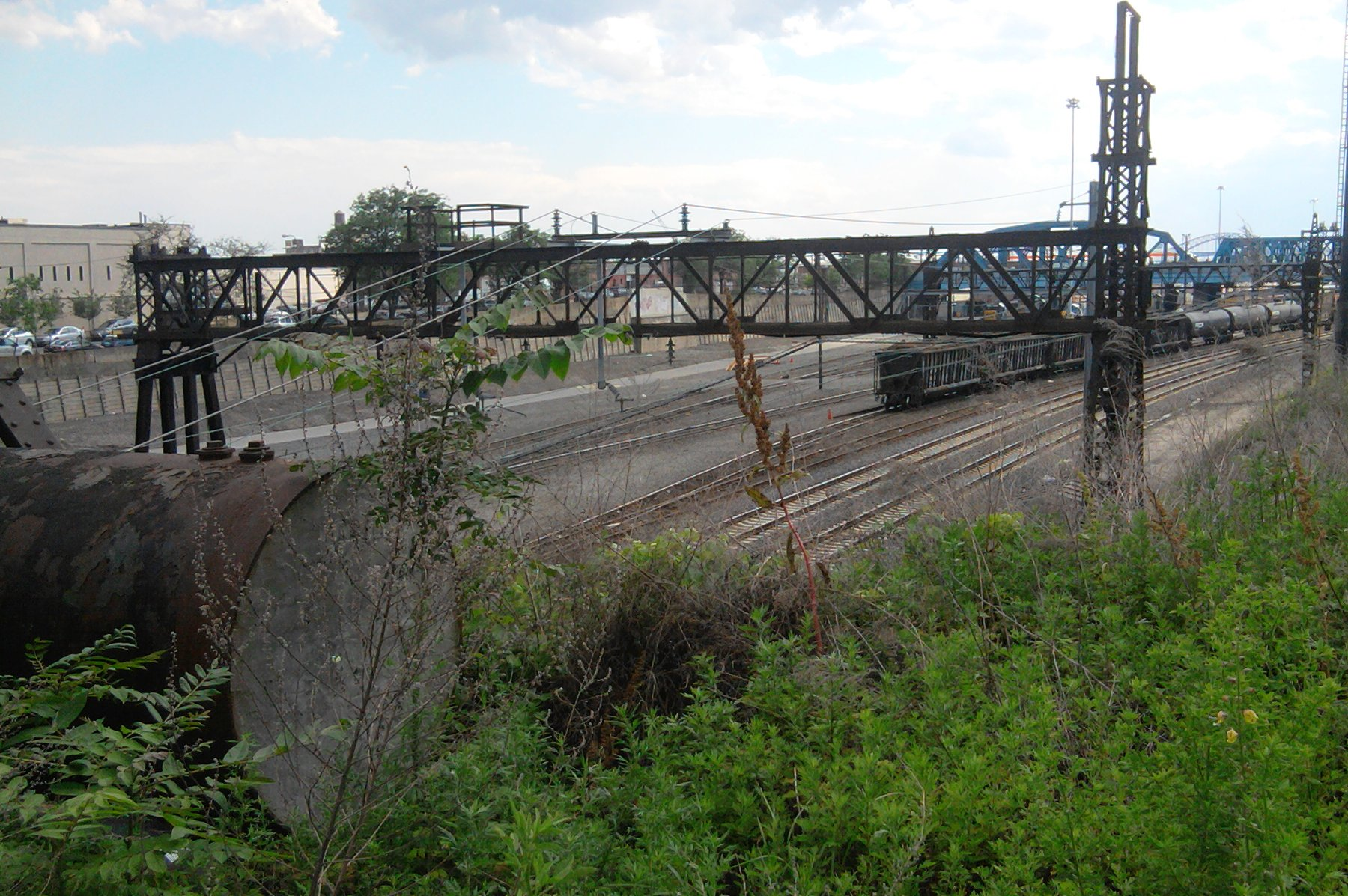
Northern part of yard

The Oak Point Yard is a freight railroad yard located in Hunts Point, The Bronx, New York City. The yard is owned by CSX Transportation, and is a base for CSX's local deliveries in the area, including to the Hunts Point Cooperative Market and for trains that interchange freight with the New York and Atlantic Railway at Fresh Pond Junction in Queens.

CP Rail formerly handled some freight in and out of Oak Point, but during late 2010 entered a haulage-rights agreement with CSX under which CSX handles and forwards its local traffic between Oak Point and the Albany, New York area. Stone-hauling trains belonging to the Providence & Worcester Railroad operate through Oak Point during trips between New Haven, Connecticut and the NY&A at Fresh Pond, but no P&W freight is actually handled in the yard. Amtrak owns and operates two electrified tracks for the Northeast Corridor Line, on the northwest side of the yard. CSX uses the Oak Point Link, a connecting track along the Harlem River, to travel between the yard and the Metro-North Hudson Line, which is its primary access route into New York, while the P&W stone trains enter via the Northeast Corridor line to the northeast. CSX and P&W trains to Fresh Pond cross the Hell Gate Bridge onto Long Island.

In 2009, CSX announced that four ultra-low emission Genset locomotives will operate full-time at its Oak Point Yard where they will be used to switch cars within the yard and for road switching service. The GenSet locomotives, manufactured by National Railway Equipment Company, reduce nitrous oxide and particulate matter emissions by 80 percent and can reduce carbon dioxide emissions by approximately 50 percent by monitoring engine idling and switching to "sleep" mode after a period of inactivity.

Oak Point Yard was formerly a Conrail facility, inherited from Penn Central, which in turn acquired the yard and associated lines in 1969 when it consummated a regulatory-induced, forced merger with the New Haven Railroad. In its New Haven days, Oak Point Yard covered a much larger area and was also a transfer point for railroad car floats that delivered railcars to waterfront terminals throughout New York Harbor.

== See also ==
- List of railroad yards in New York City
