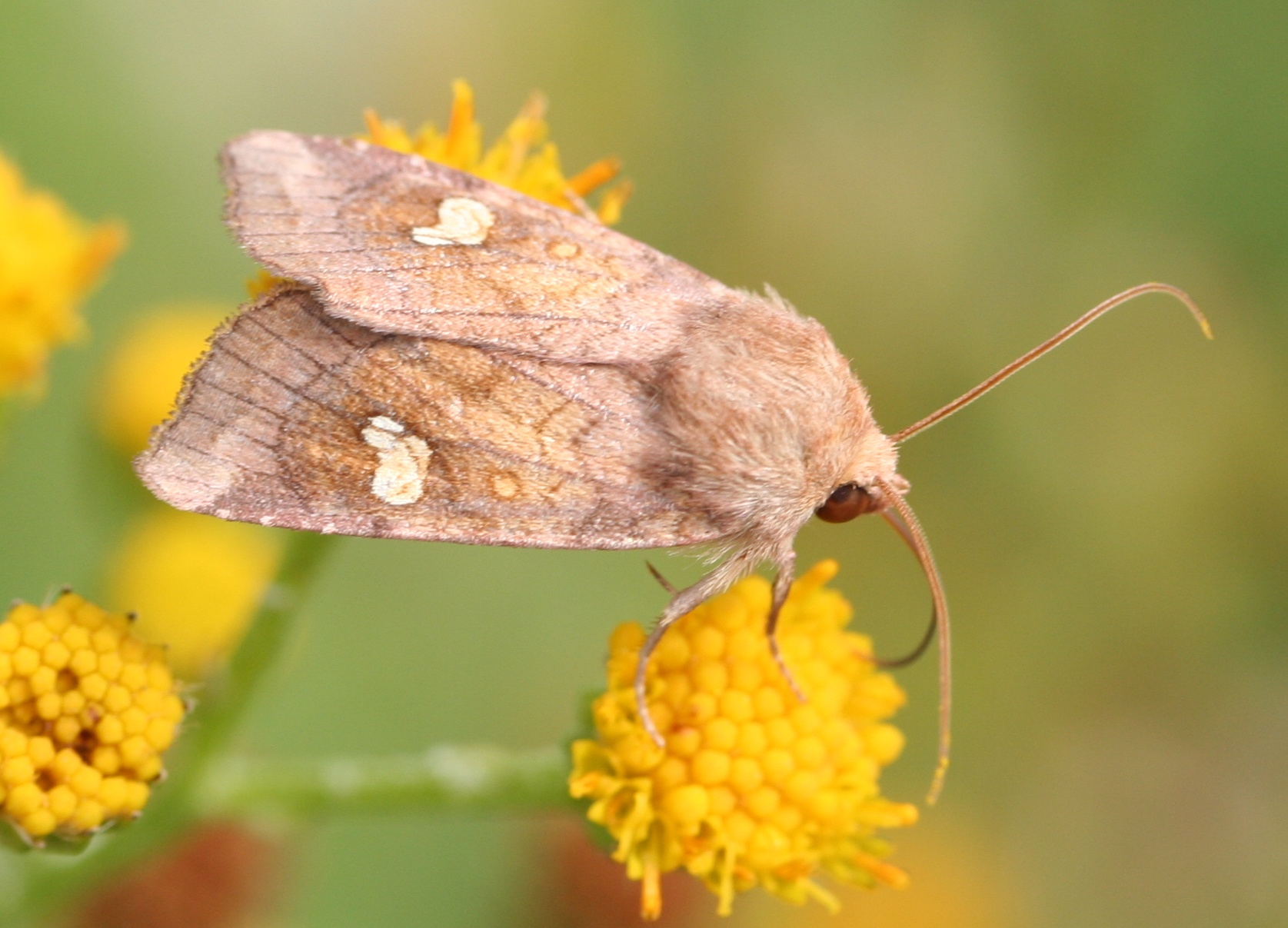

Scientific classification
- Kingdom: Animalia
- Phylum: Arthropoda
- Clade: Pancrustacea
- Class: Insecta
- Order: Lepidoptera
- Superfamily: Noctuoidea
- Family: Noctuidae
- Genus: Amphipoea
- Species: A. fucosa

Binomial name
- Amphipoea fucosa (Freyer, 1830)

= Amphipoea fucosa =

Species of moth

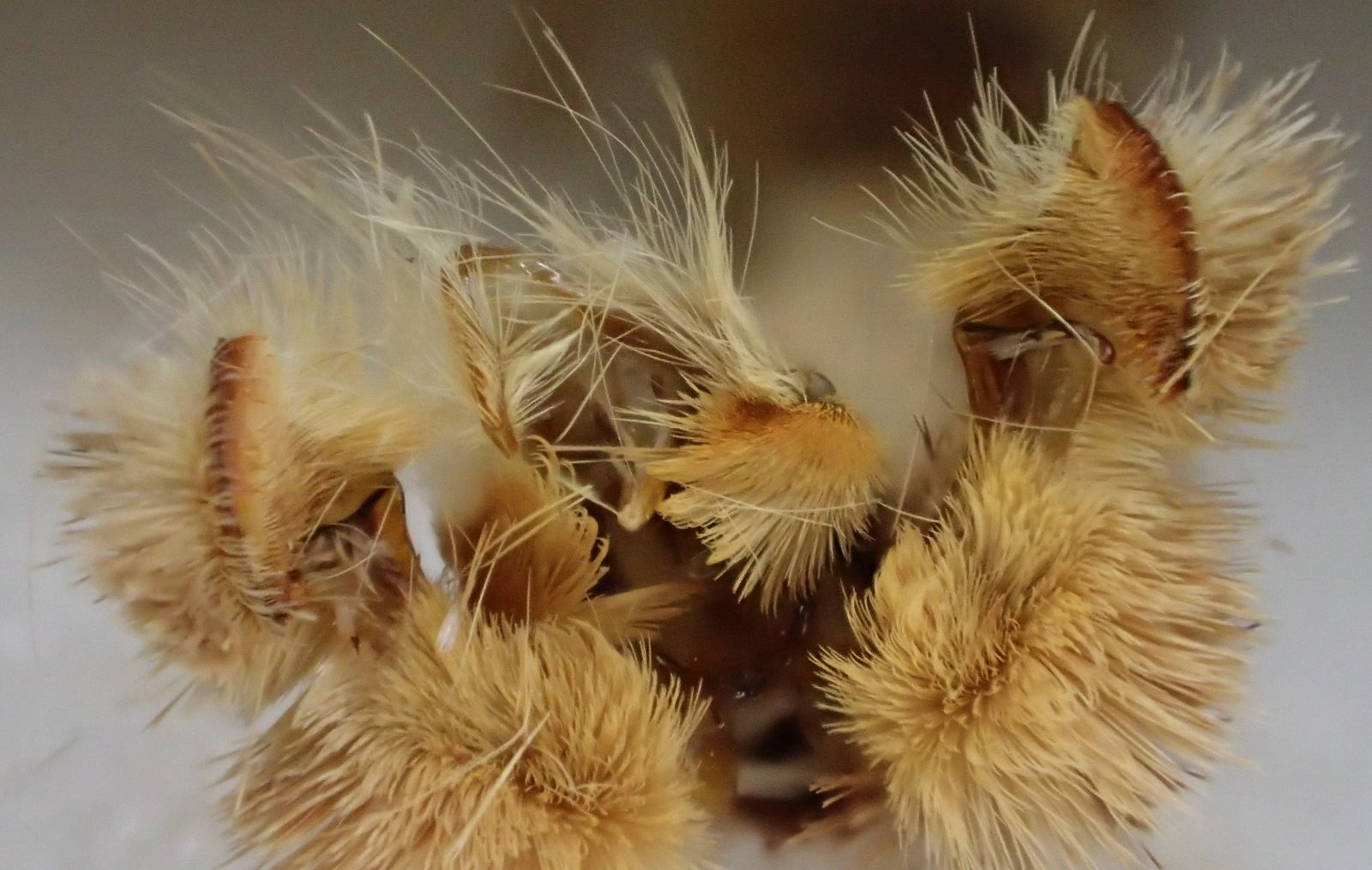
Amphipoea fucosa male genitalia

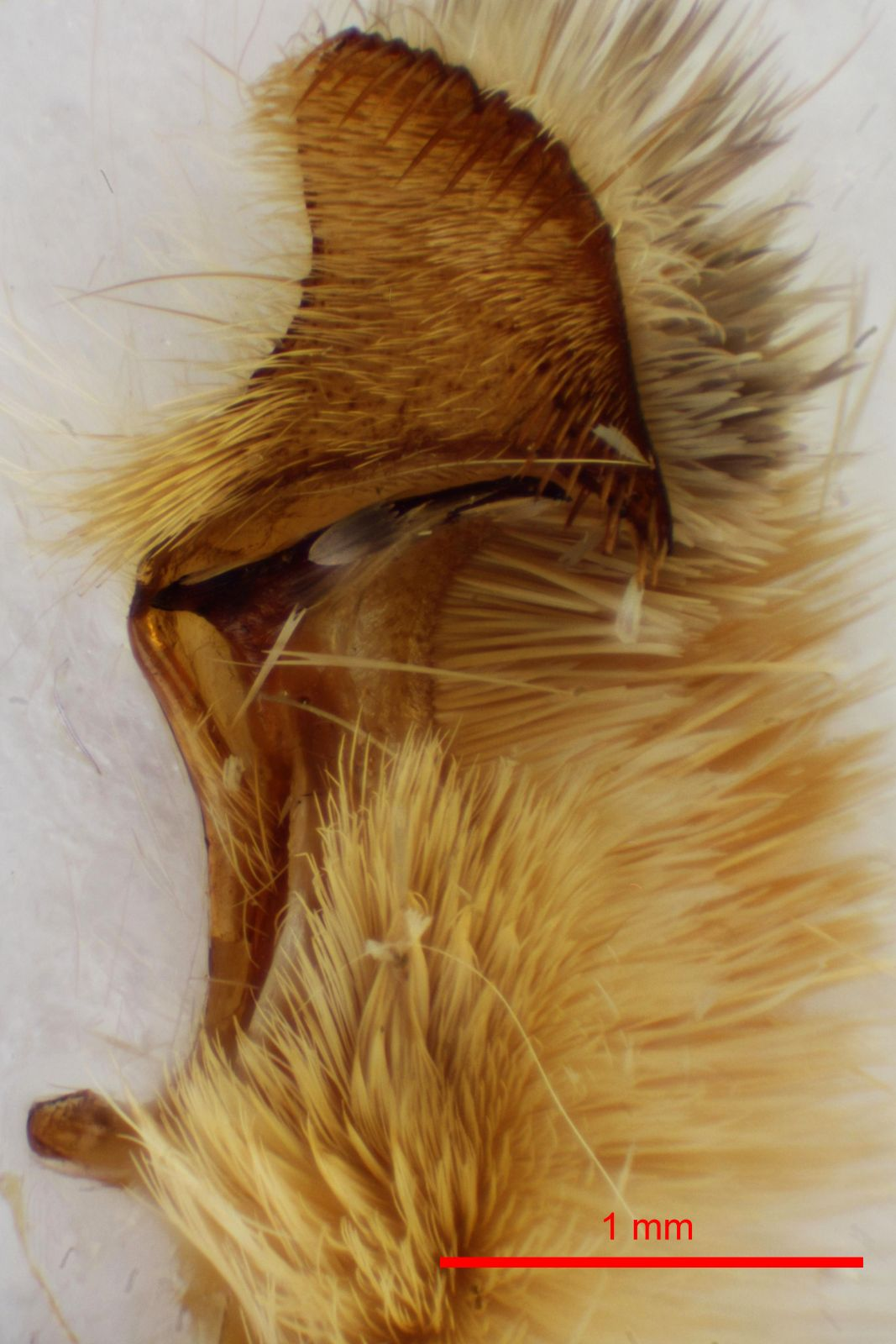
Amphipoea fucosa harper for identification

Amphipoea fucosa, the saltern ear moth, is a moth of the superfamily Noctuoidea, found in Europe. It was described in 1830, by the German entomologist Christian Friedrich Freyer, from two type specimen found in Sligo, Ireland and Deal, Kent. It is one of four species that are difficult to tell apart, requiring the examination of the genitalia. The larvae feed in the stems and roots of grasses.

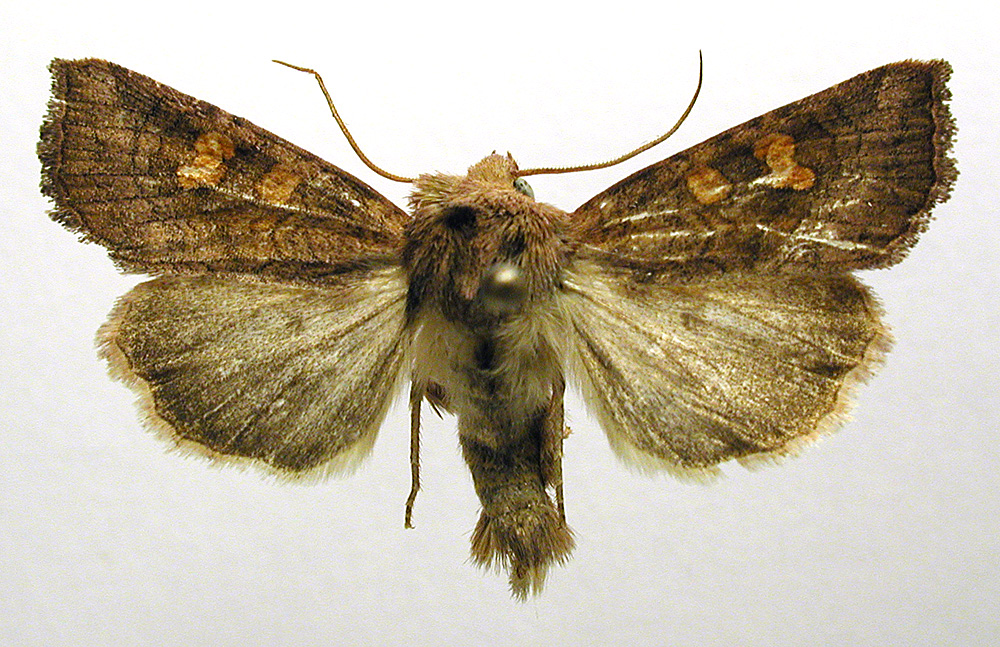
Mounted

== Description ==
The wingspan is 29–35 mm. It resembles the ear moth (Amphipoea oculea) but is larger. The moth is univoltine, flying in August and September. At night it can be found at flowering ragwort (Jacobaea vulgaris), marram grass and rushes and also comes to light.

The moth overwinters as an egg, and larvae can be found from May to June, where they feed in the stems and roots of various grasses. In the wild they have been found on common saltmarsh grass (Puccinellia maritima) and accept cock's-foot (Dactylis glomerata) and annual meadow grass (Poa annua) in captivity. Pupation takes about a month, in the soil by a root.

=== Similar species ===
Requiring genitalic examination See Townsend et al.,

- Crinan ear (Amphipoea crinanensis)
- ear moth (Amphipoea oculea)
- large ear (Amphipoea lucens)
- a hybrid between the saltern ear and the large ear has been recorded in the Outer Hebrides, Scotland.

== Taxonomy ==
Freyer, when describing the moth in 1830, placed it in the genus Amphipoea, which was raised by the Swedish anatomist Gustaf Johan Billberg in 1820. Amphipoea refers to Amphi – round, and poa – grass; i.e. the habitat. The specific name, fucosa, means either painted or spurious. Painted in the sense beautiful or copied as in counterfeit, or spurious, probably in the sense of a copy of Amphipoea oculea and not distinct from.
