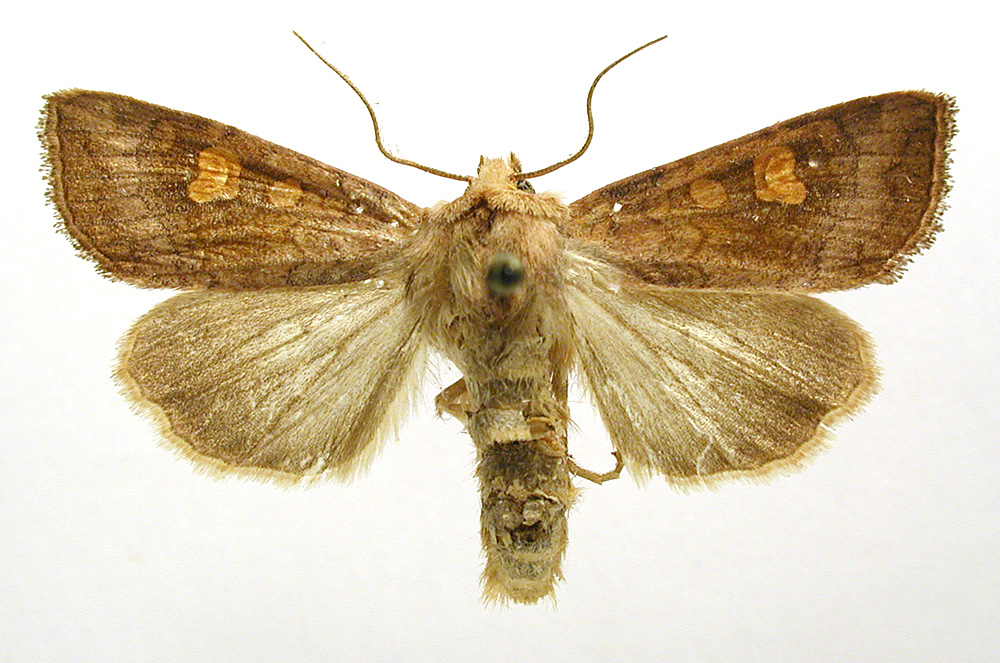

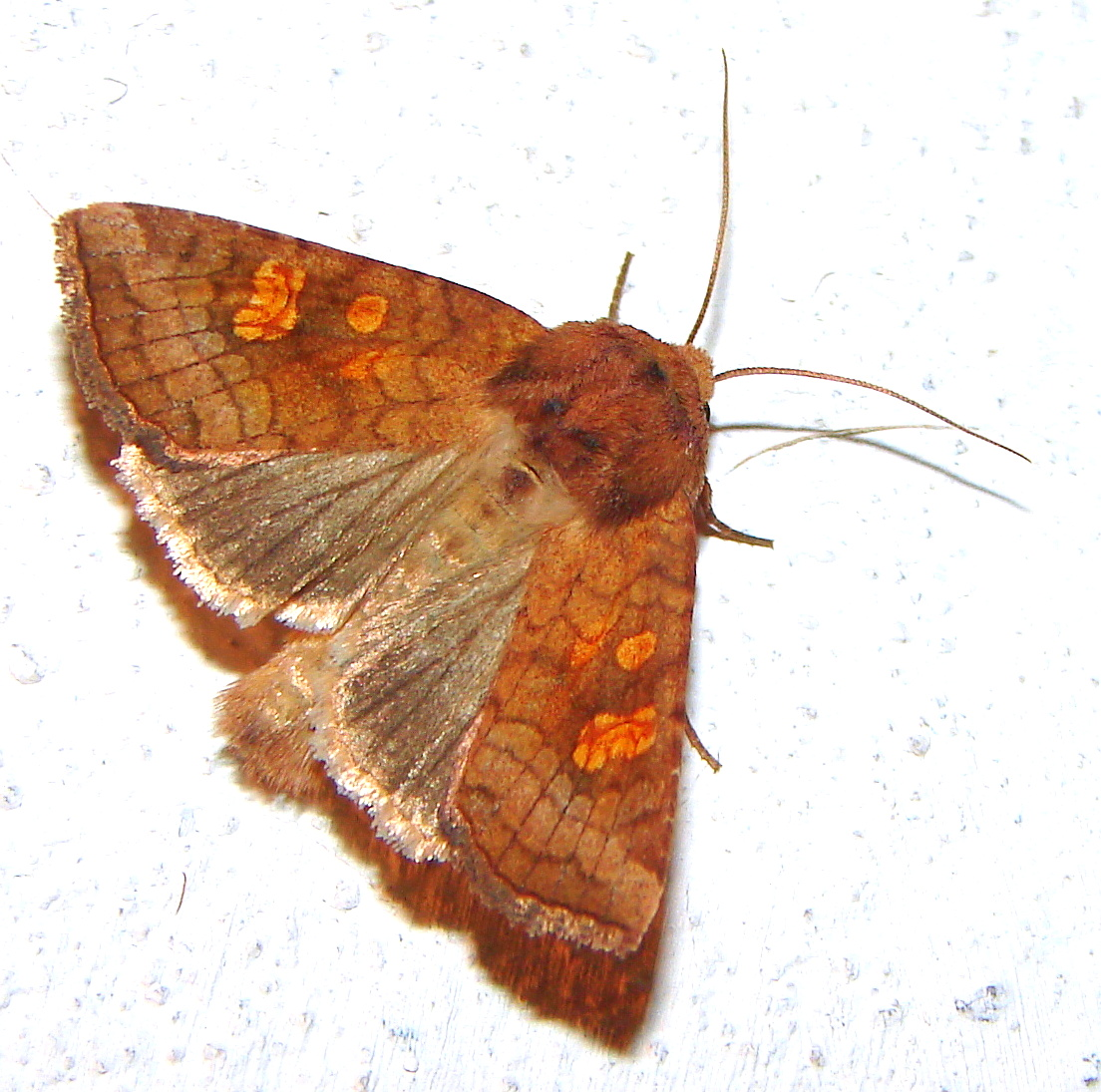

Scientific classification
- Kingdom: Animalia
- Phylum: Arthropoda
- Class: Insecta
- Order: Lepidoptera
- Superfamily: Noctuoidea
- Family: Noctuidae
- Genus: Amphipoea
- Species: A. lucens

Binomial name
- Amphipoea lucens (Freyer, 1845)

Synonyms
- Apamea lucens Freyer, 1845; Apamea lucens motojondensis Bryk, 1949

= Amphipoea lucens =

Species of moth

Amphipoea lucens, the large ear or large ear moth, is a moth of the family Noctuidae and is found in most of Europe. It was first described, in 1845, by the German entomologist, Christian Friedrich Freyer, from a specimen, found in Berlin. The larvae feed on the roots and stems of grasses.

== Description ==
The wingspan is about 30–36 mm. It resembles the ear moth (Amphipoea oculea), but is larger, with the ground colour, as a rule, pale and the reniform white. Adults are on wing from August to September and come to flowers, especially rushes and also comes to light.

The larvae feed from May to July, at first within the lower stems and later among the roots of purple moor-grass (Molinia caerulea) and common cottongrass (Eriophorum angustifolium). Pupation takes place on the ground in the leaf litter and the moth overwinters as an egg.

=== Similar species ===
Requiring genitalic examination to separate, See Townsend et al.,

- Crinan ear (Amphipoea crinanensis)
- ear moth (Amphipoea oculea)
- saltern ear moth, (Amphipoea fucosa)

== Taxonomy ==
Freyer, when describing the moth, placed it in the genus Apamea, which was raised by the German entomologist and actor, Ferdinand Ochsenheimer in 1820. Apamea is the name of a several towns in Asia Minor and has no entomological relevance. It was later placed in the genus Amphipoea which was raised by the Swedish anatomist Gustaf Johan Billberg in 1820. Amphipoea refers to Amphi – round and poa – grass; i.e. the habitat. The specific name, lucens means gloss or shining, referring to the bright mark on the forewing (i.e. the reniform stigma – the ear in the English name). Another possibility is the gleam of the resting moth near a lantern, as it would be seen by collectors.
