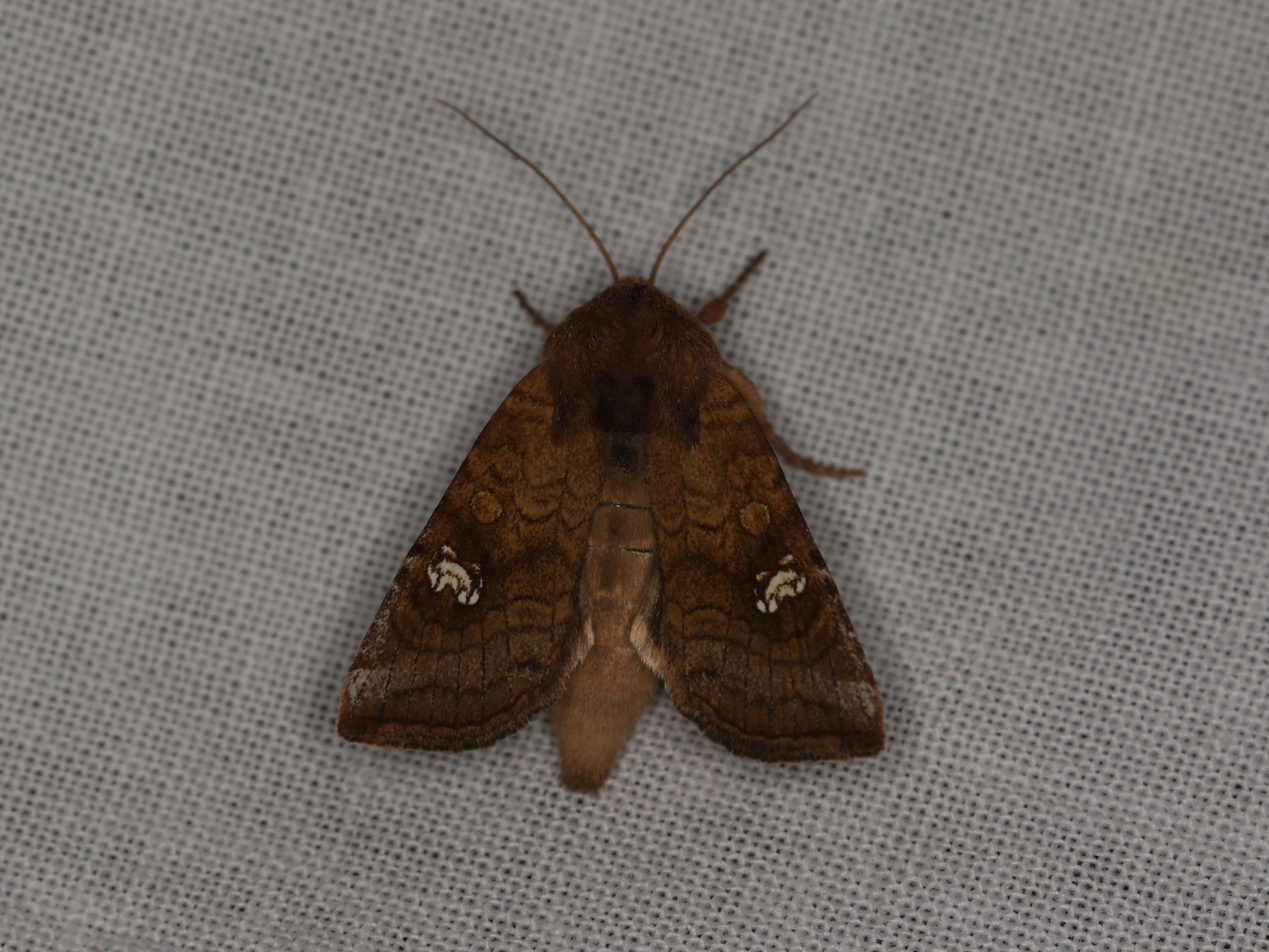
- Amphipoea sp.

Scientific classification
- Domain: Eukaryota
- Kingdom: Animalia
- Phylum: Arthropoda
- Class: Insecta
- Order: Lepidoptera
- Superfamily: Noctuoidea
- Family: Noctuidae
- Tribe: Apameini
- Genus: Amphipoea; Billberg, 1820

= Amphipoea =

Genus of moths

Amphipoea is a genus of moths of the family Noctuidae, found in the Holarctic realm.

== Species ==
- Amphipoea americana Speyer, 1875 – American ear moth
- Amphipoea asiatica (Burrows, 1911)
- Amphipoea aslanbeki Ronkay & Herczig, 1991
- Amphipoea bifurcata Gyulai & Ronkay, 1994
- Amphipoea burrowsi (Chapman, 1912)
- Amphipoea butleri (Leech, 1900)
- Amphipoea chovdica Gyulai, 1989
- Amphipoea cottlei (McDunnough, 1948)
- Amphipoea crinanensis (Burrows, 1908) – Crinan ear
- Amphipoea cuneata Gyulai & Ronkay, 1998
- Amphipoea distincta (Warren, 1911)
- Amphipoea erepta (Grote, 1881)
- Amphipoea fucosa (Freyer, 1830) – saltern ear moth
- Amphipoea interoceanica (Smith, 1899) – interoceanic ear moth
- Amphipoea keiferi (Benjamin, 1935)
- Amphipoea lucens (Freyer, 1845)– large ear moth
- Amphipoea lunata (Smith, 1891)
- Amphipoea malaisei (Nordström, 1931)
- Amphipoea maryamae Zahiri & Fibiger, 2006
- Amphipoea ochreola (Staudinger, 1882)
- Amphipoea oculea (Linnaeus, 1761) – ear moth
- Amphipoea pacifica (Smith, 1899)
- Amphipoea rufibrunnea (Heydemann, 1942)
- Amphipoea senilis (Smith, 1892) (syn: Amphipoea flavostigma (Barnes & Benjamin, 1924))
- Amphipoea szabokyi Gyulai & Ronkay, 1990
- Amphipoea ussuriensis (Petersen, 1914)

== Former species ==
- Amphipoea velata is now Loscopia velata (Walker, 1865)

== Taxonomy ==
The genus Amphipoea was raised by the Swedish anatomist Gustaf Johan Billberg in 1820. Amphipoea refers to Amphi – round and poa – grass; i.e. the habitat of the moths.
