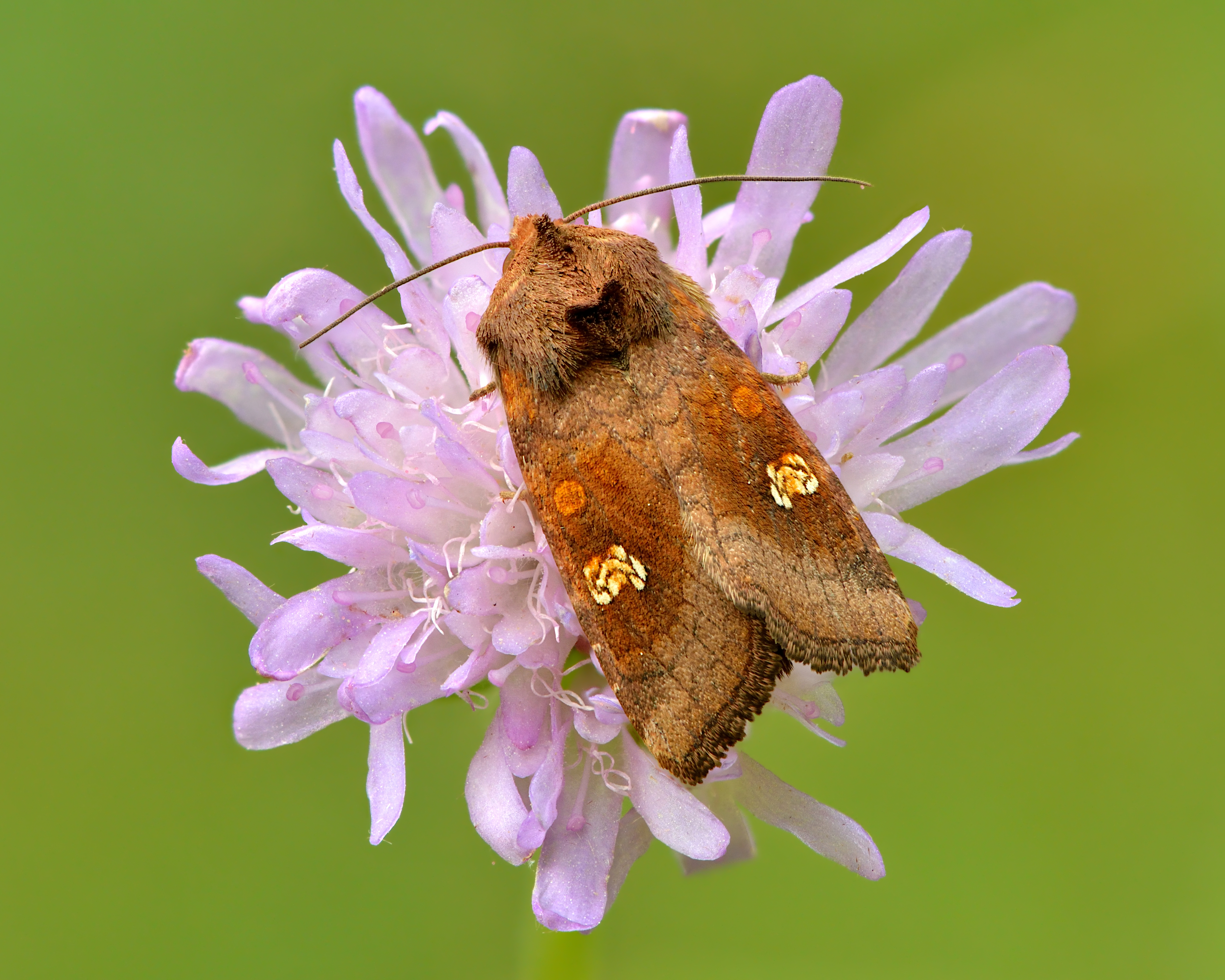

Scientific classification
- Kingdom: Animalia
- Phylum: Arthropoda
- Clade: Pancrustacea
- Class: Insecta
- Order: Lepidoptera
- Superfamily: Noctuoidea
- Family: Noctuidae
- Genus: Amphipoea
- Species: A. oculea

Binomial name
- Amphipoea oculea (Linnaeus, 1761)

Synonyms
- List: Phalaena Noctua oculea Linnaeus, 1761; Phalaena Noctua nictitans Linnaeus, 1761; Noctua chrysographa Denis & Schiffermüller, 1775; Phalaena Noctua splendens Borkhausen, 1792; Noctua myopa Fabricius, 1794; Noctua cinerago Fabricius, 1794; Noctua auricula Donovan, 1807; Noctua erythrostigma Haworth, 1809; Apamea oculea var. struvei Oberthür, 1818

= Amphipoea oculea =

Ear moth

Species of moth

Amphipoea oculea, the ear moth, is a moth of the family Noctuidae. It was first described by Carl Linnaeus in 1761 and it is found in most of the Palearctic realm. It is widespread and common in southern England, and also occurs in Ireland and throughout continental Europe, with the exception of Albania, Greece and Turkey. It is one of four species that are difficult to tell apart, requiring the examination of the genitalia. The larvae feed in the stems and roots of low plants and grasses.

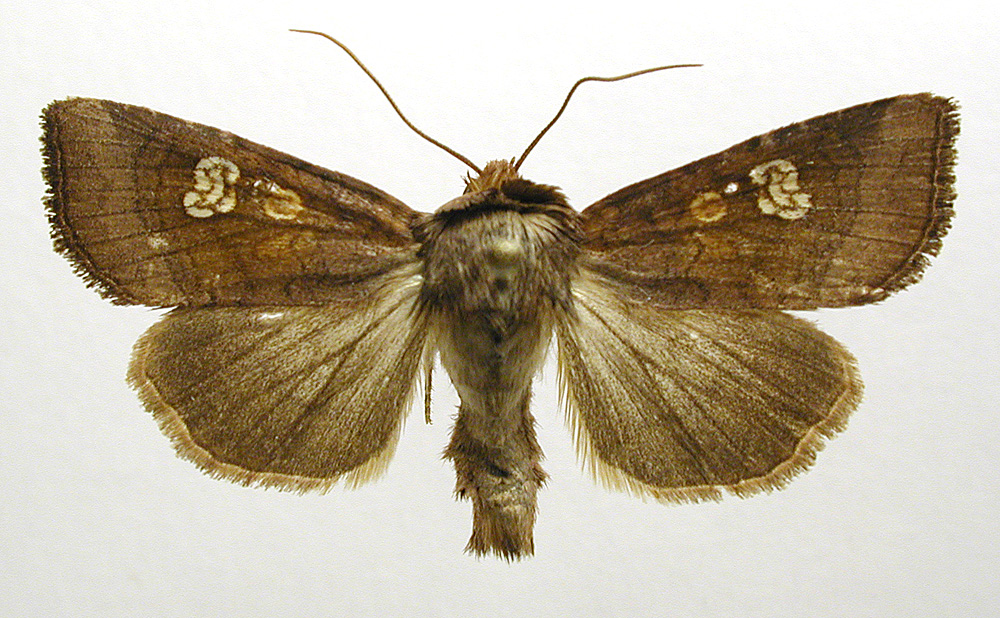
Mounted

== Description ==
The wingspan is 29–34 mm. Forewing pale or dark ferruginous brown; the veins brown; inner and outer lines double, brown, wide apart; the inner curved outwards between, and toothed inwards on, the veins; the outer with the inner arm thin, lunulate-dentate, the outer thick, continuous and parallel; a thick dark median shade running between the stigmata; submarginal line indistinct, waved, angled on vein 7, above which it is preceded by a dark costal patch; orbicular stigma rounded, orange, with a brown ring; reniform white, with the veins across it brown and containing on the discocellular a brown-outlined lunule, of which the centre is yellowish; the colour with brown outline; hindwing fuscous grey, paler towards base; the fringe rufous tinged.

Adults are found from June to September depending on the location. There is one generation per year. At night the moths come to light and to flowers, honeydew and sugar. During the day it feeds on the flowers of thistles and ragwort.

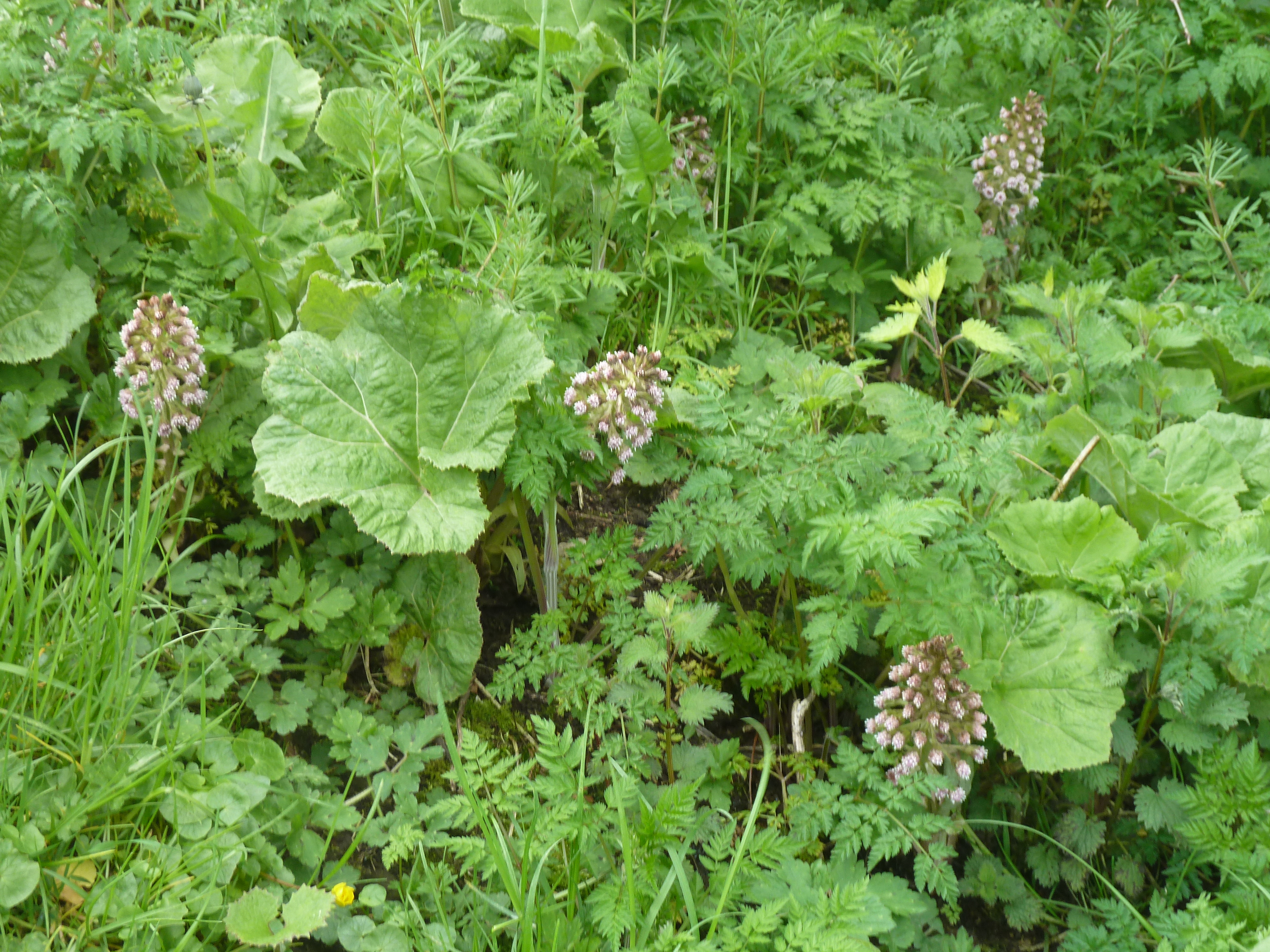
Habitat, Ireland

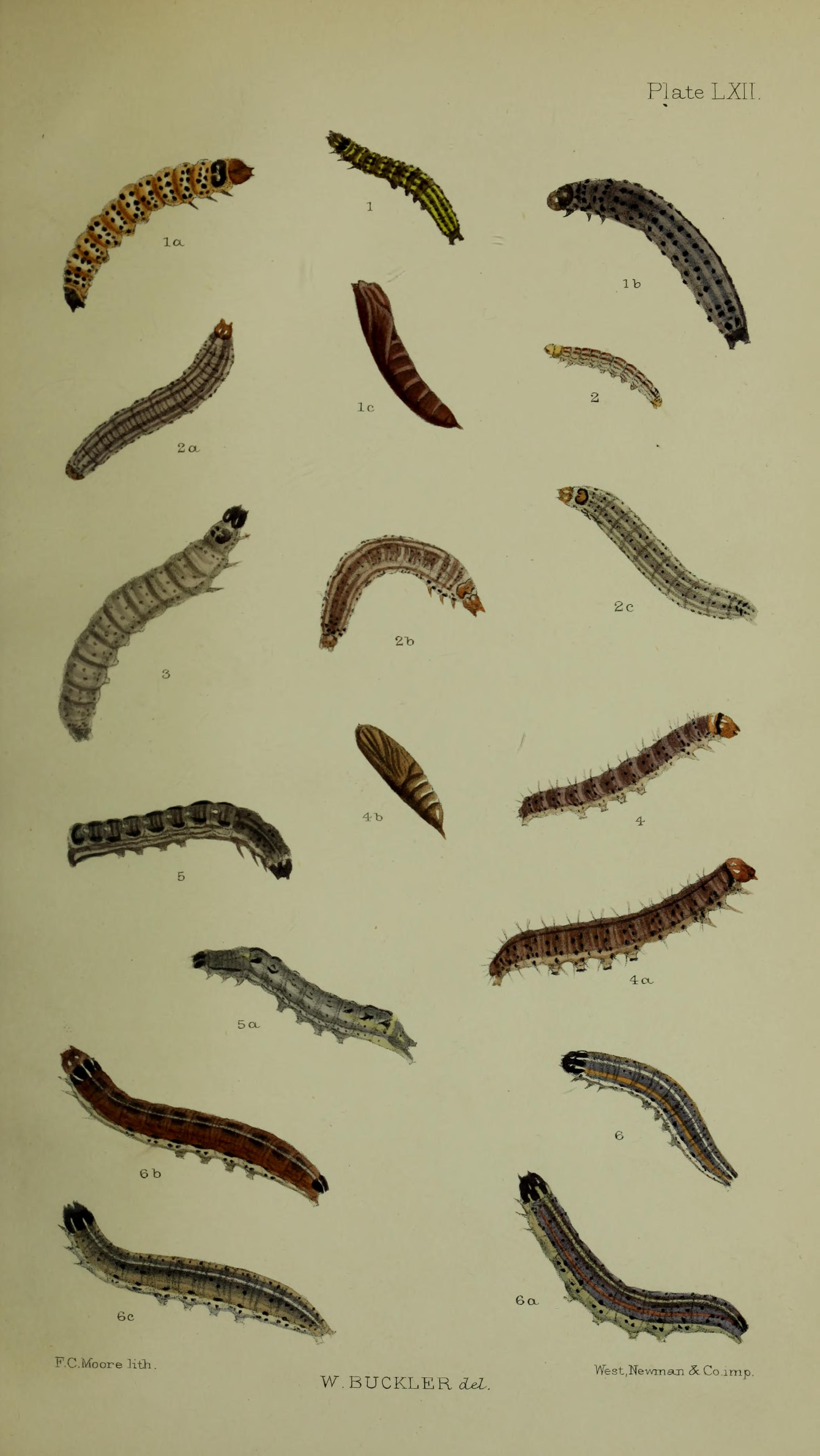
Figs 2 young larva 2a, 2b, 2c, 2d larva after last moult

The larvae feed, from April to June, on the stems and roots of various grasses and low plants, including butterbur (Petasites hybridus) and tufted hair-grass (Deschampsia cespitosa); preferring damp habitats.

== Similar species ==
Requiring genitalic examination to separate. See Townsend et al.

- Crinan ear (Amphipoea crinanensis)
- large ear (Amphipoea lucens)
- saltern ear (Amphipoea fucosa)

== Taxonomy ==
Carl Linnaeus, when describing the moth, placed it in the genus Phalaena, from a specimen found in Sweden. Phalaena is now an obsolete genus which was used by Linnaeus to house most of the moths. The moth is now placed in the genus Amphipoea which was raised by the Swedish anatomist Gustaf Johan Billberg in 1820. Amphipoea refers to Amphi – round and poa – grass; i.e. the habitat. The specific name, oculea, means eyed, from the reniform stigma, which British entomologists referred to as an 'ear'.

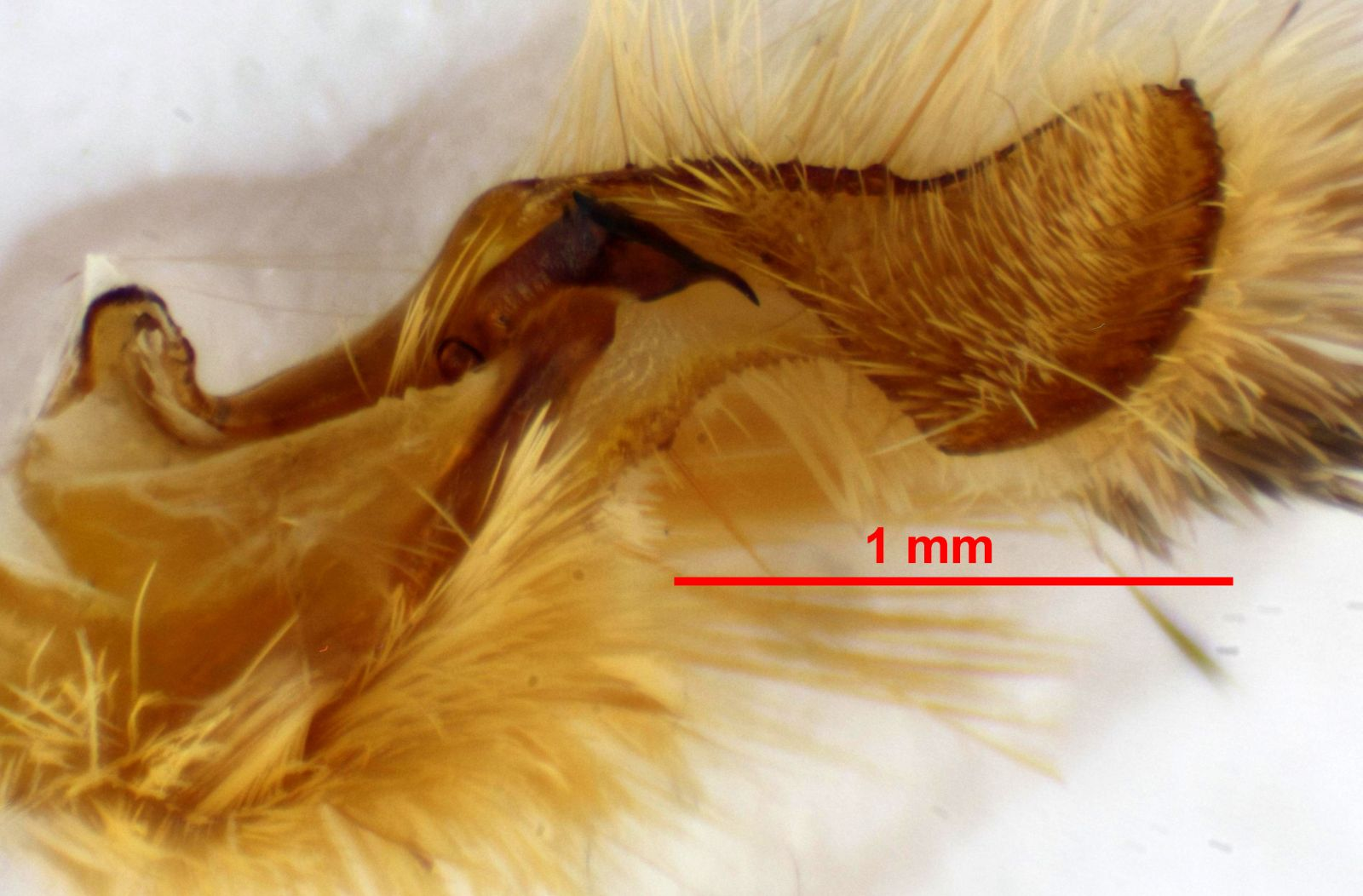
Amphipoea oculea harper, important for identification
