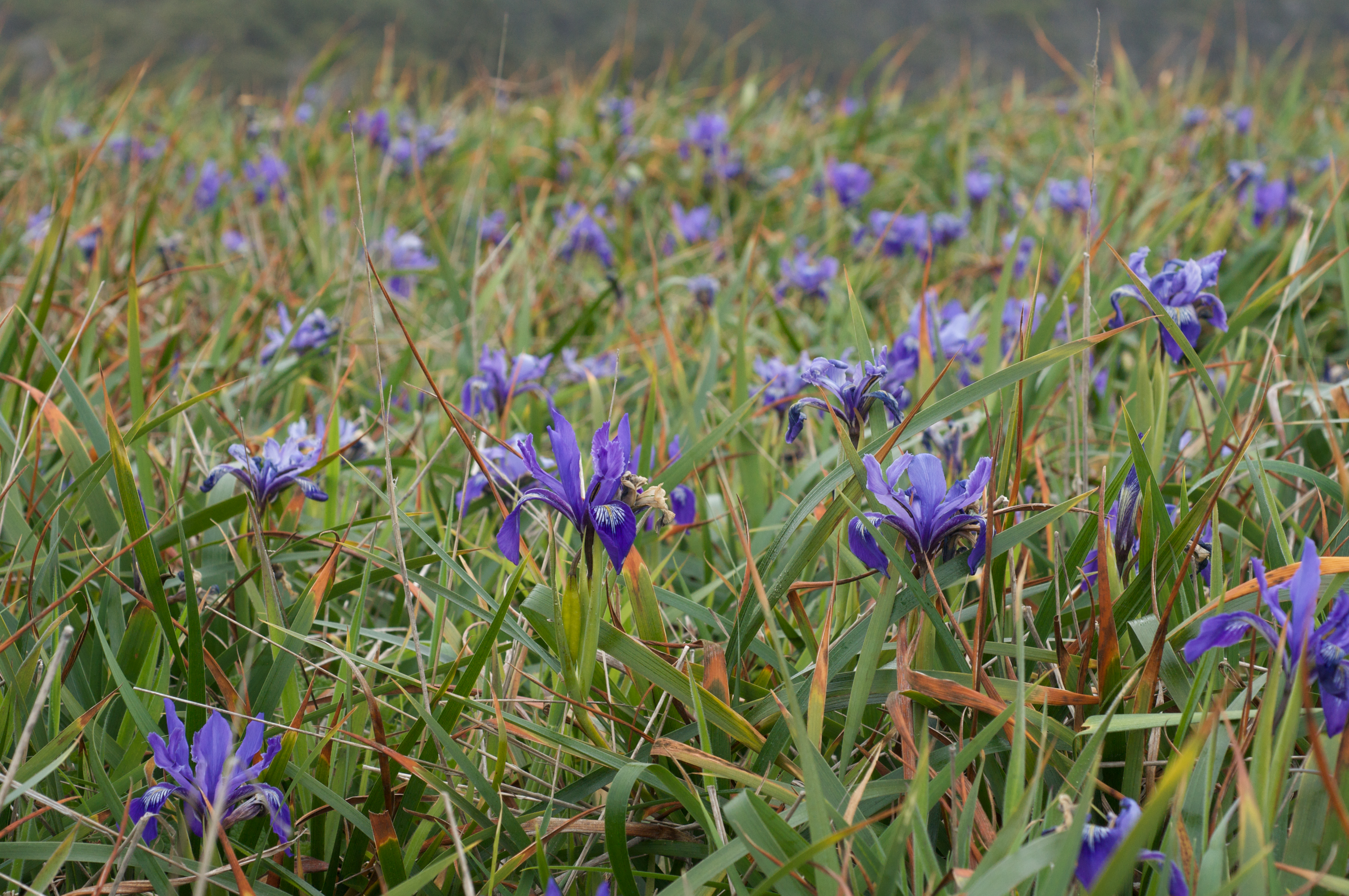

Conservation status
- Apparently Secure (NatureServe)

Scientific classification
- Kingdom: Plantae
- Clade: Tracheophytes
- Clade: Angiosperms
- Clade: Monocots
- Order: Asparagales
- Family: Iridaceae
- Genus: Iris
- Subgenus: Iris subg. Limniris
- Section: Iris sect. Limniris
- Series: Iris ser. Californicae
- Species: I. douglasiana

Binomial name
- Iris douglasiana Herb.

Synonyms
- Iris beecheyana Herb.; Iris douglasiana f. alpha (Dykes) R.C.Foster; Iris douglasiana var. alpha Dykes; Iris douglasiana var. altissima Purdy ex Jeps.; Iris douglasiana var. beecheyana (Herb.) Baker; Iris douglasiana var. bracteata Herb.; Iris douglasiana var. major Torr.; Iris douglasiana var. mendocinensis Eastw.; Iris douglasiana var. nuda Herb.; Iris douglasiana var. oregonensis R.C.Foster; Iris watsoniana Purdy; Limniris douglasiana (Herb.) Rodion.

= Iris douglasiana =

Douglas iris

Species of flowering plant

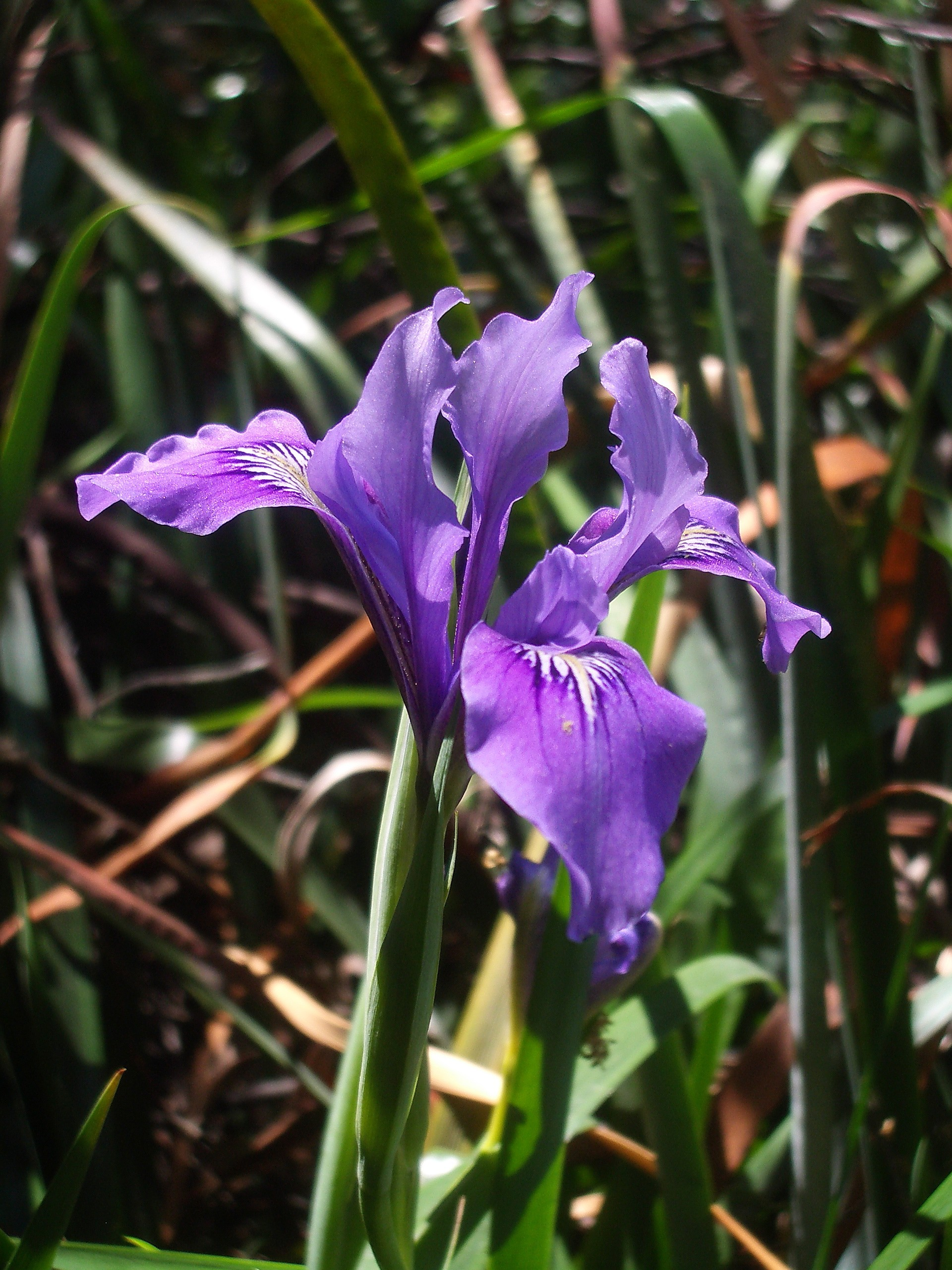
Close-up of flower

Iris douglasiana, the Douglas iris, is a common wildflower of the coastal regions of Northern and Central California and southern Oregon in the United States. It grows mainly at lower elevations and is most common in grasslands near the coast. The plant is commonly cultivated outside of its native range, and has been used by humans for its strong fibers and medicinal properties.

== Description ==
I. douglasiana is a beardless iris typical of subgenus Limniris, series Californicae. It grows from a rhizome that is typically less than a centimeter in diameter. Its leaves are about 2 centimeters (0.79 in) wide and may grow up to 1 meter (3 ft) long. Leaf color ranges from yellow to dark green, with a more red appearance at the base. The flowers, appearing from April to June, are usually a purplish-blue, though occasionally white or yellow flowers are found. Two or three flowers are found on each stem, which is of variable height, ranging from 15–80 centimeters (5.9–31.5 in) tall. Flowers have three nectar-producing subunits, usually exhibiting both male and female parts (a stamen and style, respectively). I. douglasiana is protandrous, meaning pollen becomes available to pollinators before the stigma matures. However, male-sterile plants have also been found in the wild. These are less common, but may be less susceptible to damage from insect larvae. During pollination, bees typically visit only one subunit of the flower. This pattern, in addition to the protandrous flowering, reduces the likelihood of self-fertilization. Flowers mature into capsules containing up to 80 seeds.

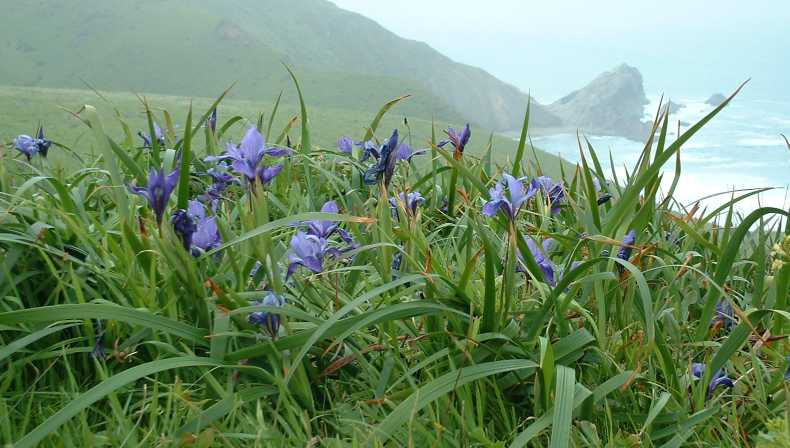
Iris douglasiana growing on an exposed hillside in Point Reyes, California.

== Distribution and habitat ==
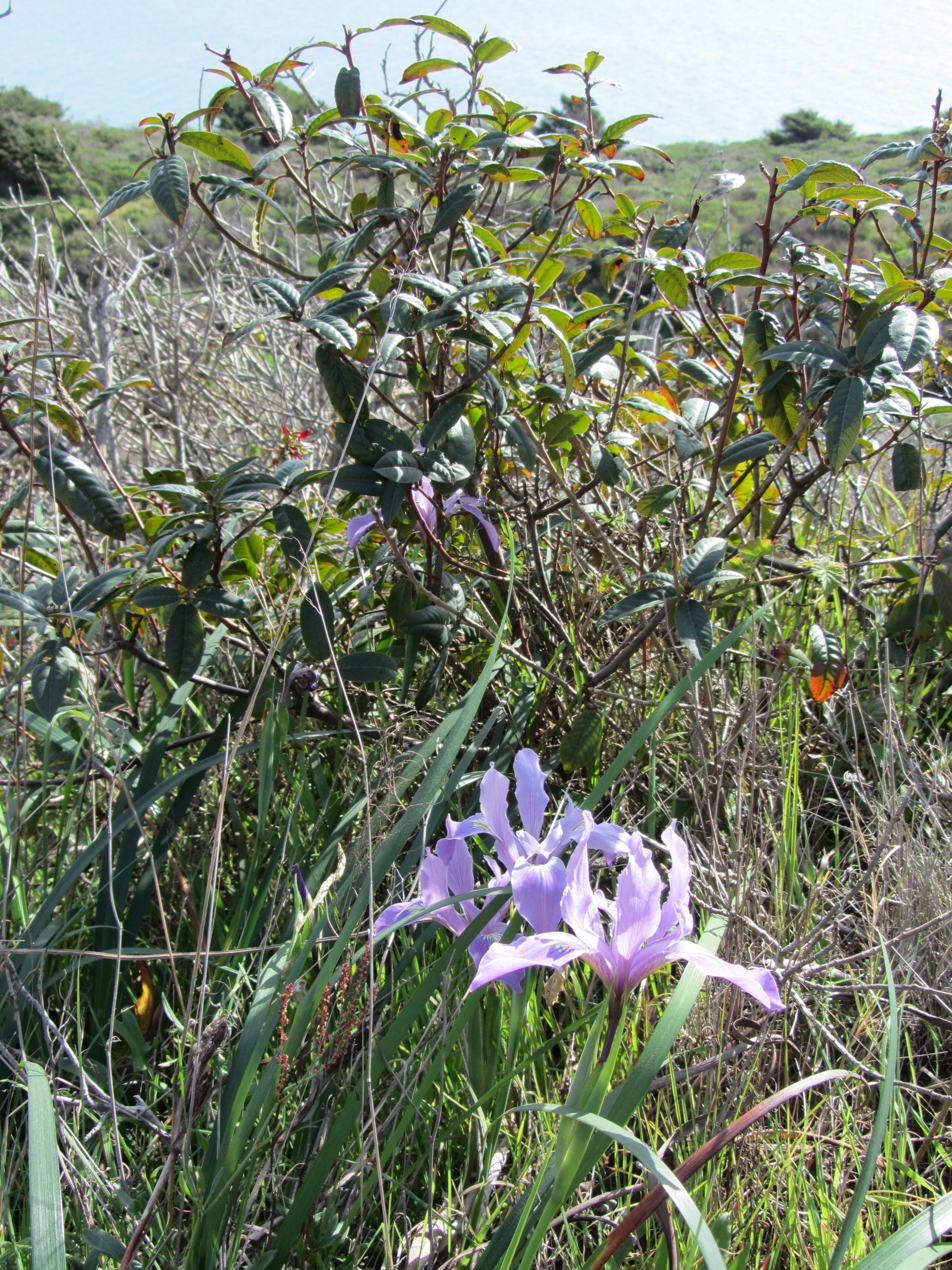
Iris douglasiana growing in chaparral next to Rhamnus californica (coffeeberry).

I. douglasiana can be found in the wild in mainland coastal areas, ranging from southern Oregon to central California. It prefers sunny areas, usually found in grasslands and occasionally forests. It tolerates a range of soil types and can spread quickly after disturbances. It is usually found below 100 meters (330 ft) elevation.

== Taxonomy ==
It was first described by 19th century botanist David Douglas in Monterey, California and was first published by the British botanist William Herbert in 'Bot. Beechey Voy.' 9 on page 395 in 1840. Several varieties have been recognized, for example Iris douglasiana var. altissima (Jeps.) and Iris douglasiana var. oregonensis (R. C. Foster), but the species is highly variable and the varieties may not be well enough defined to be of much practical use. The Douglas iris hybridizes freely with several other species; its natural hybrid with I. innominata has been designated as Iris ×thompsonii (R. C. Foster), and the garden hybrid with the same species as Iris ×aureonympha (E. H. English). The zone of hybridization with I. innominata is relatively small, and the species remain separate due to adaptations to different habitats.

== Ethnobotany ==
I. douglasiana has many useful properties, used primarily by Indigenous peoples such as the Pomo. However, it is not safe to consume as food and can cause severe discomfort if ingested in large quantities. Medicinal applications include use as a diuretic or laxative, to induce vomiting, or to treat infection on external wounds. Furthermore, fibers along the leaf margins can be extracted and combined to construct nets, strings, ropes, and snares. Processing the leaves requires a significant amount of time, but the resulting products are strong and flexible.

== Cultivation ==
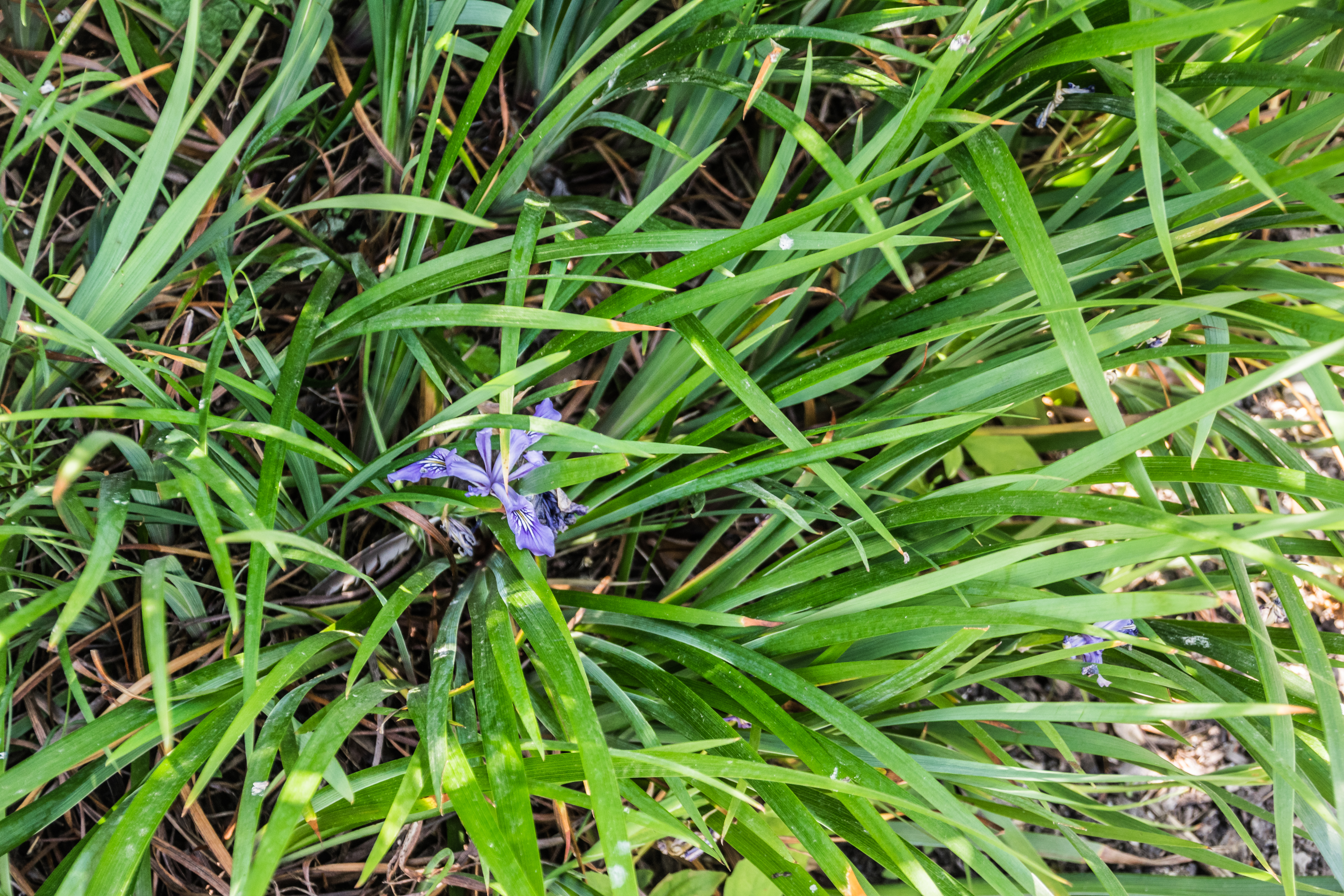
Iris douglasiana in Christchurch Botanic Gardens, showing dense growth.

I. douglasiana is frequently cultivated, both within its native range and beyond. Notably, this plant has gained the Royal Horticultural Society's Award of Garden Merit, indicating its suitability for gardening in the United Kingdom. New plants can be propagated from seeds or by separating growth connected by rhizomes. Left unattended, irises will spread in the immediate area through both of these methods. I. douglasiana can become infected by moth larvae of the species Macronoctua onusta (iris borer) and Amphipoea americana var. pacifica.
