= Amphipoea crinanensis =

Crinan ear

Scientific classification
- Domain: Eukaryota
- Kingdom: Animalia
- Phylum: Arthropoda
- Class: Insecta
- Order: Lepidoptera
- Superfamily: Noctuoidea
- Family: Noctuidae
- Genus: Amphipoea
- Species: A. crinanensis

Binomial name
- Amphipoea crinanensis (Burrows, 1908)

Synonyms
- Hydroecia crinanensis Burrows, 1908

Species of moth

Amphipoea crinanensis, also known as the Crinan ear, is a moth of the family Noctuidae, found in Europe. It is one of four species that are difficult to tell apart, requiring the examination of the genitalia. The species was described by Charles Richard Nelson Burrows in 1908.

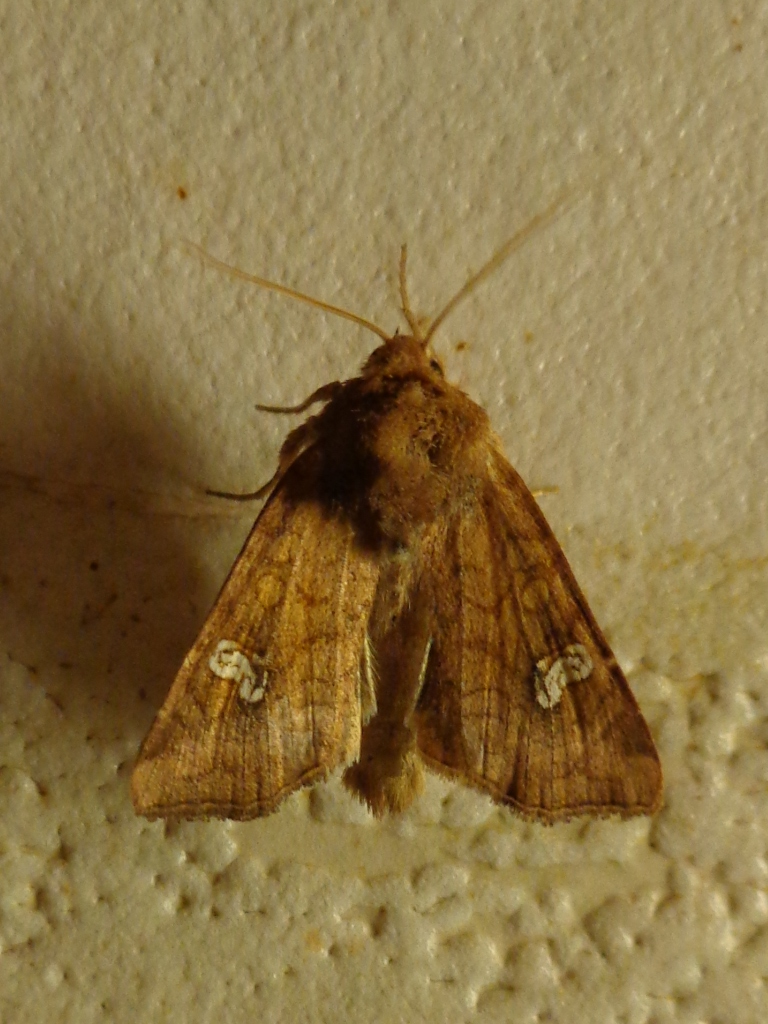

== Description ==
The wingspan is 30–33 mm. The ground colour of the forewings ranges from burnt sienna through to reddish brown. The reniform stigma is yellow or orange or occasionally white. The orbicular stigma obscure. The crosslines are darker than the ground colour. The hindwings are brownish ochreous and have a small discal spot. Adults are univoltine, flying during August in September and come to light and flowers, especially devil's-bit scabious (Succisa pratensis).

The moth overwinters as an egg and the larvae feed from April to June. It has been recorded on iris in the wild, while in captivity it has fed on the inner stems of yellow iris (Iris pseudacorus). They may also feed in the stems and roots of grasses. The pupal stage lasts four to six weeks, although it is not known where pupation takes place..

=== Similar species ===
Requiring genitalic examination to separate. See Townsend et al.,

- large ear (Amphipoea lucens)
- saltern ear (Amphipoea fucosa)
- ear moth (Amphipoea oculea)

== Distribution ==
It is found in Fennoscandia, Ireland, Great Britain, Denmark, Germany, the Baltic region and central Europaean Russia.

== Taxonomy ==
Burrows, described the moth in 1908 placing it in the genus Hydroecia, which means to water and to dwell, referring to the damp habitat of the species. It was later moved to Amphipoea, which was raised by the Swedish anatomist Gustaf Johan Billberg in 1820. Amphipoea refers to Amphi – round, and poa – grass; i.e. the habitat. The specific name, crinanensis – from the Crinan Canal in Scotland, the type locality.
