= Amphipoea pacifica =

Scientific classification
- Kingdom: Animalia
- Phylum: Arthropoda
- Clade: Pancrustacea
- Class: Insecta
- Order: Lepidoptera
- Superfamily: Noctuoidea
- Family: Noctuidae
- Tribe: Apameini
- Genus: Amphipoea
- Species: A. pacifica

Binomial name
- Amphipoea pacifica (Smith, 1899)

Species of moth

Amphipoea pacifica is a species of cutworm or dart moth in the family Noctuidae. It is found in North America.
