= Amphipoea keiferi =

Scientific classification
- Domain: Eukaryota
- Kingdom: Animalia
- Phylum: Arthropoda
- Class: Insecta
- Order: Lepidoptera
- Superfamily: Noctuoidea
- Family: Noctuidae
- Tribe: Apameini
- Genus: Amphipoea
- Species: A. keiferi

Binomial name
- Amphipoea keiferi (Benjamin, 1935)

Species of moth

Amphipoea keiferi is a species of cutworm or dart moth in the family Noctuidae. It is found in North America.

The MONA or Hodges number for Amphipoea keiferi is 9460.
