= Amphipoea erepta =

Scientific classification
- Domain: Eukaryota
- Kingdom: Animalia
- Phylum: Arthropoda
- Class: Insecta
- Order: Lepidoptera
- Superfamily: Noctuoidea
- Family: Noctuidae
- Genus: Amphipoea
- Species: A. erepta

Binomial name
- Amphipoea erepta (Grote, 1881)

Species of moth

Amphipoea erepta is a species of cutworm or dart moth in the family Noctuidae. It is found in North America.

The MONA or Hodges number for Amphipoea erepta is 9461.

South of Orchard Beach in Pelham Bay Park, The Bronx in New York City is a 25-acre (10 ha) meadow that hosts the only known population of the subspecies Amphipoea erepta ryensis.
