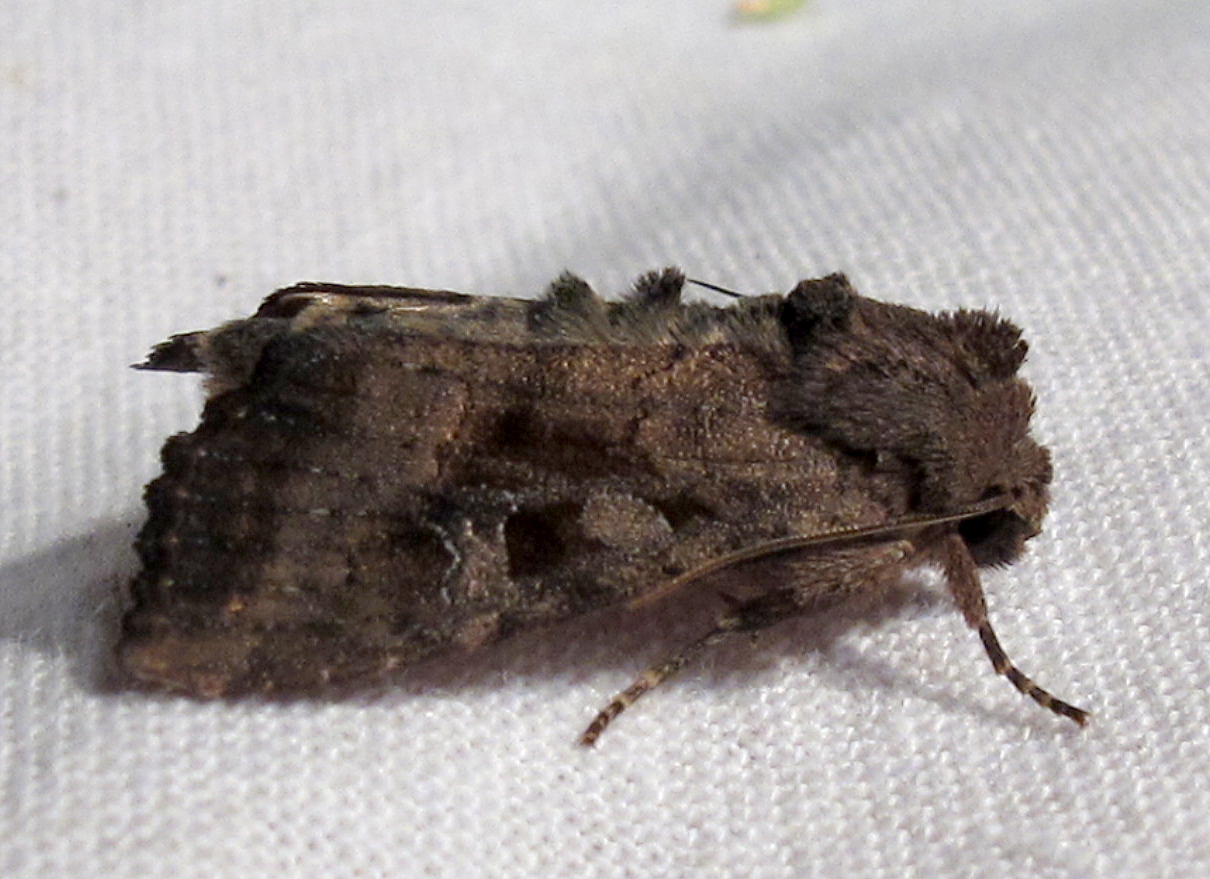
- Veiled Ear Moth Loscopia velata, Wheatley, Ontario, Canada

Scientific classification
- Domain: Eukaryota
- Kingdom: Animalia
- Phylum: Arthropoda
- Class: Insecta
- Order: Lepidoptera
- Superfamily: Noctuoidea
- Family: Noctuidae
- Tribe: Apameini
- Genus: Loscopia; Beck 1991

= Loscopia =

Genus of moths

Loscopia is a genus of moths of the family Noctuidae.

== Species ==
- Loscopia roblei Quinter & Lafontaine, 2009
- Loscopia velata (Walker, 1865)
