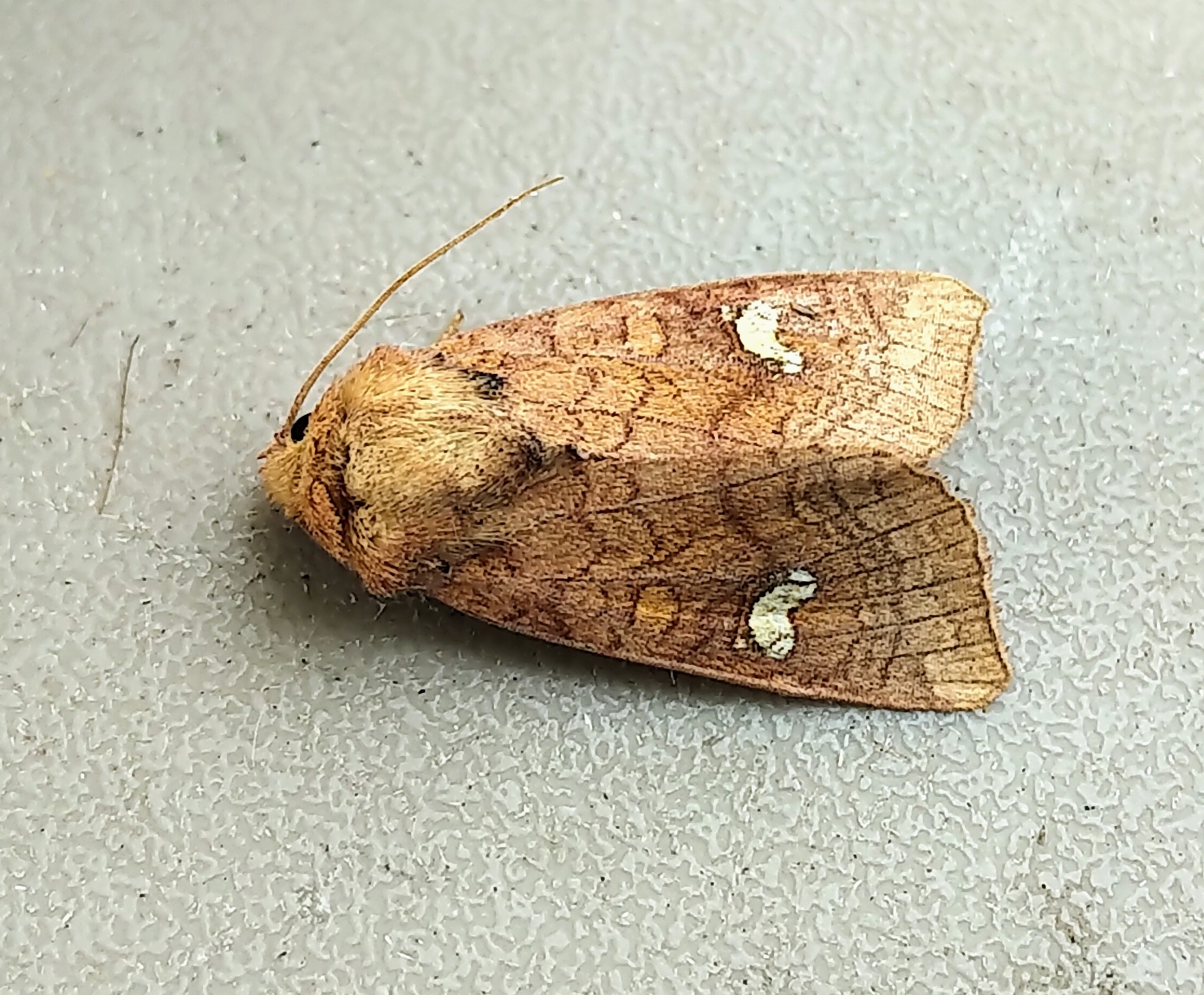

Scientific classification
- Domain: Eukaryota
- Kingdom: Animalia
- Phylum: Arthropoda
- Class: Insecta
- Order: Lepidoptera
- Superfamily: Noctuoidea
- Family: Noctuidae
- Genus: Amphipoea
- Species: A. interoceanica

Binomial name
- Amphipoea interoceanica Smith, 1899

Synonyms
- Hydroecia interoceanica

= Amphipoea interoceanica =

Species of moth

Amphipoea interoceanica, commonly known as the interoceanic ear moth, strawberry cutworm moth or strawberry cutworm, is a species of moth in the family Noctuidae first described by Smith in 1899. It is found from coast to coast in the United States. In Canada from Quebec west to Alberta, Nova Scotia.

The wingspan is 28–35 mm (1.1–1.4 in). Adults are on wing from July to August depending on the location.

The larvae feed on the leaves, stems and fruit stalks of Fragaria species, grasses and sedges.
