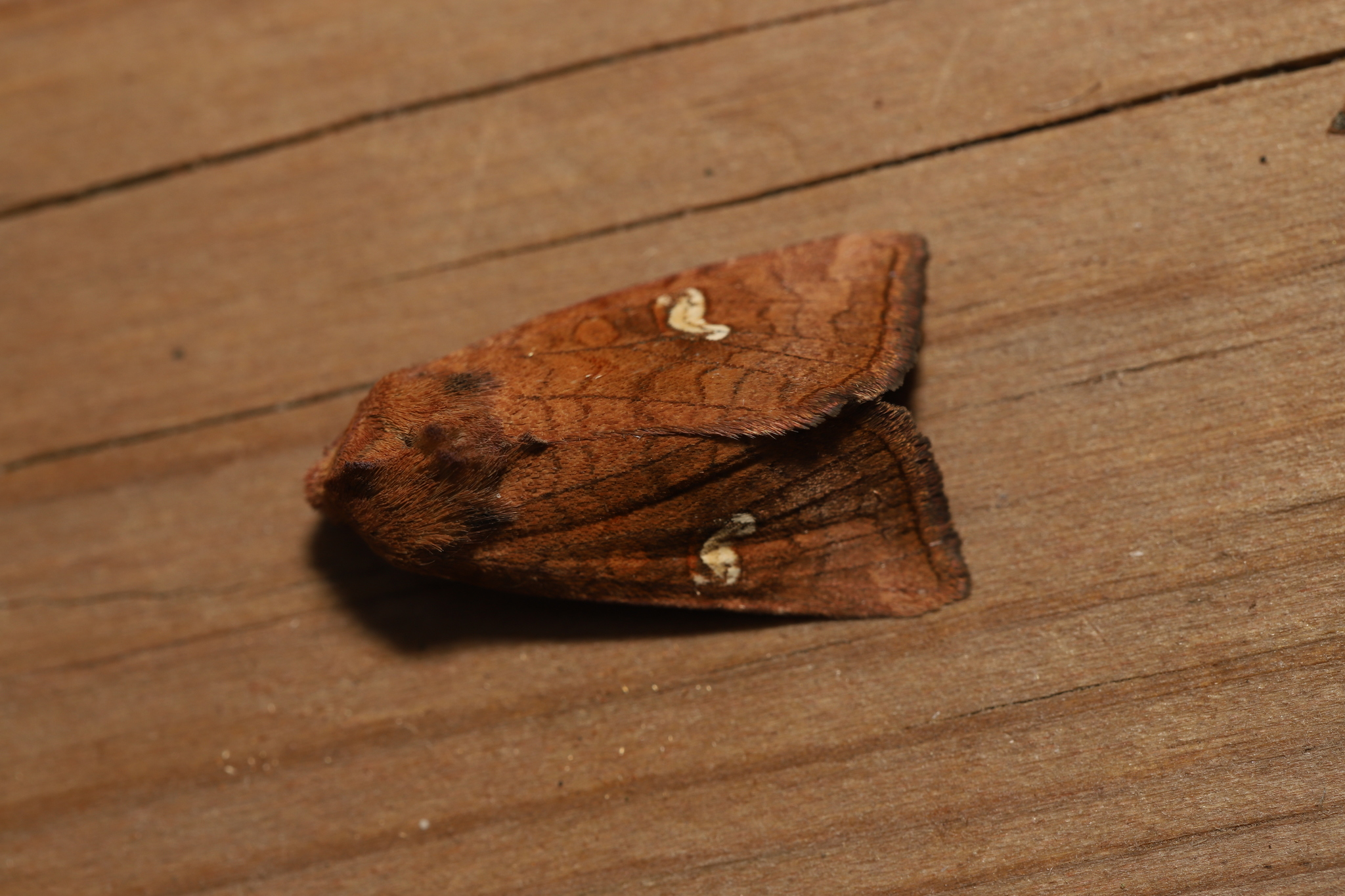

Scientific classification
- Domain: Eukaryota
- Kingdom: Animalia
- Phylum: Arthropoda
- Class: Insecta
- Order: Lepidoptera
- Superfamily: Noctuoidea
- Family: Noctuidae
- Genus: Amphipoea
- Species: A. americana

Binomial name
- Amphipoea americana Speyer, 1875

Synonyms
- Hydroecia atlantica; Amphipoea lusca; Amphipoea atlantica

= Amphipoea americana =

American ear moth

Species of moth

Amphipoea americana, the American ear moth, is a moth of the family Noctuidae. The species was first described by Adolph Speyer in 1875. It is found from coast to coast in the northern United States and southern Canada, it is also present in the Northwest Territories, south in the west to California, south in the east to Georgia

The wingspan is 28–35 mm. Adults are on wing from July to September depending on the location.

The larvae feed on grasses, sedges and sometimes on the roots of corn.

== Subspecies ==
- Amphipoea americana americana
- Amphipoea americana pacifica
