= Orchard Beach (Bronx) =

Public beach in the Bronx, New York

- Beach
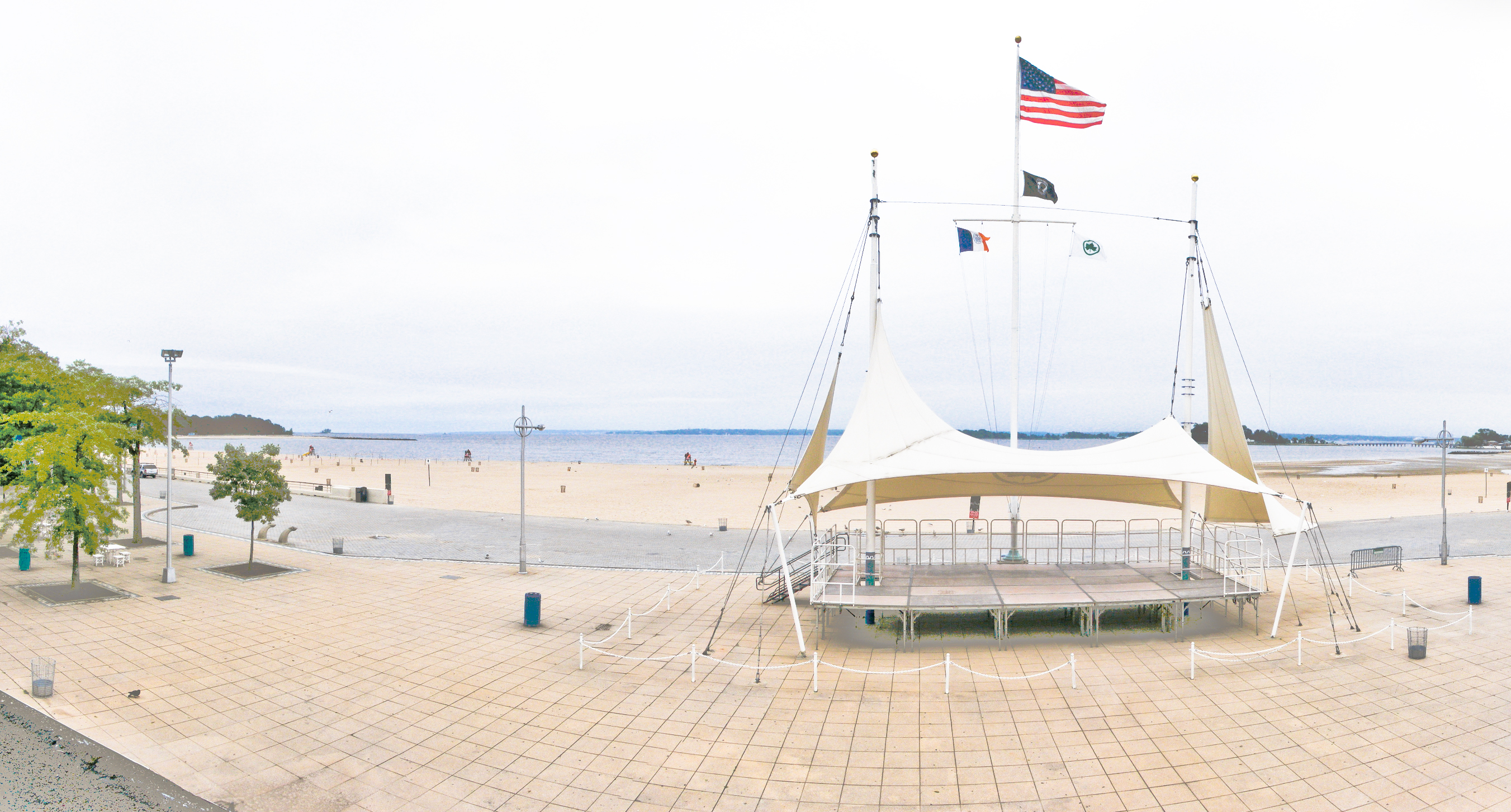
- Panoramic view of Orchard Beach, facing from the bathhouse pavilion
- Interactive map of Orchard Beach
- Coordinates: 40.8673°N 73.7925°W
- Location: The Bronx, New York

Area
  - Total: 115-acre (47 ha)

Dimensions
  - Length: 1.1 miles (1.8 km)
- Patrolled by: New York City Department of Parks and Recreation
- Public transit access: Bus: Bx12, Bx29

Orchard Beach (sometimes called the Bronx Riviera) is the only public beach in the New York City borough of the Bronx. The 115-acre (47 ha), 1.1-mile-long (1.8 km) beach is part of Pelham Bay Park and is situated on the western end of Long Island Sound. The beach consists of a 13-section sandy shorefront, a hexagonal-block promenade, and a central pavilion with food stores and specialty shops. The recreational facilities include two playgrounds, two picnic areas, a large parking lot, and 26 courts for basketball, volleyball, and handball. It is operated by the New York City Department of Parks and Recreation.

Orchard Beach was built as part of Pelham Bay Park and was originally located on the eastern shore of Rodman's Neck peninsula. In the 1930s, New York City parks commissioner Robert Moses announced a project to expand Orchard Beach northward by connecting several islands in Pelham Bay Park via landfill. The expanded beach was dedicated in 1936 and opened in 1937, along with its pavilion and concession stands. Renovations to the beachfront were made in subsequent years. Sand was restored to the beach in 1964 and again in 1995. The promenade and bathhouse were designated as a city landmark by the New York City Landmarks Preservation Commission in 2006.

== Description ==
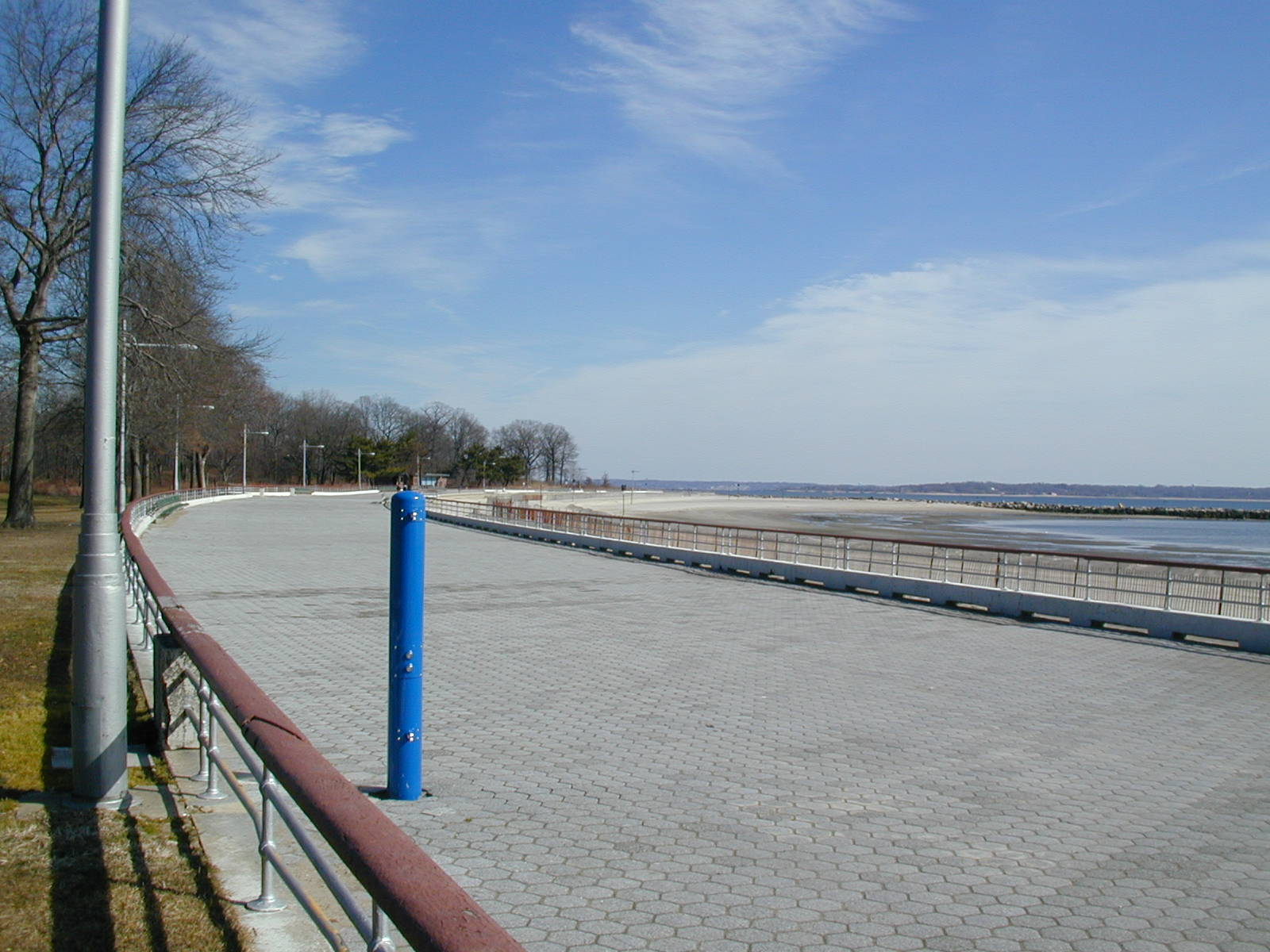
Orchard Beach promenade, built in the 1930s

Orchard Beach is in the eastern section of Pelham Bay Park in the northeastern Bronx and is the Bronx's only public beach. An icon of the Bronx, Orchard Beach is sometimes called the Bronx Riviera or Hood Beach. The 1.1-mile-long (1.8 km), 115-acre (47 ha) beach faces the Long Island Sound and is laid out in a crescent shape with a width of 200 feet (61 m) during high tide. The modern beach was designed by Aymar Embury II, working with consulting landscape architects Gilmore David Clarke and Michael Rapuano.

Orchard Beach contains a 1,400-foot-long (430 m), 250-foot-wide (76 m) center mall connecting the bathhouses and boating lagoon. At the time of opening, there were also nine baseball diamonds, seven football fields, 32 tennis courts, a children's playground, and a field house. When the beach opened it contained a pavilion with two bathhouses, as well as a cafeteria, a small-boat lagoon, a 5,400-person locker and dressing facility, and two parking lots with a collective 8,000 spots. The beach could host up to 100,000 bathers simultaneously; the bathhouses alone could fit six or seven thousand bathers. The modern beach contains the Orchard Beach Nature Center, as well as two playgrounds, some basketball courts, some handball courts, and three tennis courts.

South of the beach is a 25-acre (10 ha) meadow that hosts the only known population of the moth species Amphipoea erepta ryensis. Another population formerly existed in Rye, Westchester County.

=== Bathhouse ===
The bathhouse, designed by Embury, is composed of a raised plaza flanked by two pavilions to the north and south. From the mall on the west, a broad staircase rises to the raised plaza. The raised plaza contains bluestone tile pavements. The center of the plaza originally had a large fountain, which was removed in 1941 and replaced with a compass made of granite, bluestone, and slate. At the eastern end of the plaza is a curving concrete wall, with two staircases to the north and south, which lead to a lower terrace and the beachfront promenade. The staircases contain granite steps and concrete balustrades. The lower terrace, east of the pavilions, had trees as well as a dance floor and a bandstand that were later removed. The lower terrace level contains concession windows beneath the curved wall of the raised plaza.

The pavilions are made mostly in red brick and concrete, with various details made of stone, terracotta, and metal. The ground story of each pavilion is at the level of the beach, while the second story is at the same level as the raised entry plaza. Each pavilion has a rectangular, concrete waiting structure facing the entry plaza. There are tall openings on all sides of each waiting structure, with metal grilles in the upper portions of each opening. Inside each pavilion are terrazzo floors. The viewing balconies originally contained brass lighting, benches, and telephone booths. There are blue and white tiles inside the pavilions; the lowest 6 feet (1.8 m) of each pavilion's walls are clad with blue tiles. The remainders of the walls, as well as the ceilings, are made of concrete.

The waiting structures connect to outdoor concourses that slope down toward the former locker rooms. Adjacent to each concourse are one-story concrete buildings, which originally distributed towels, bathing suits, and other swim gear. The concessions windows of these one-story structures contain several metal roll-down gates as well as steel canopies. At the end of each concourse, there is a freestanding brick barrier with a semicircular niche that originally housed a fountain. Access to the locker rooms was through either side of each brick barrier. The locker wings contain brick walls and also contain exits facing the promenade to the east.

East of the waiting structures and locker areas, each pavilion contains curved loggias facing the beach to the east. The loggias are supported by square concrete columns supporting concrete friezes. The friezes carry a Greek fret motif. Inside each loggia are viewing balconies with terrazzo floors and ornamental iron handrails. These viewing balconies contain blue-tiled walls, similar to those in the waiting structures, although these walls contain portholes at regular intervals. Spiral stairs from the viewing balconies lead down to the beach levels. The ground levels of the curved loggias are made of brick segmental arches.

=== Promenade ===
For its entire length, the beach is also fronted by a 50-foot-wide (15 m) promenade with hexagonal gray tiles. Four brick utility buildings were built along the promenade: two each to the north and south of the bathhouse pavilion. The utility buildings are set back from the promenade. There are metal railings, cast-iron lampposts, concrete water fountains, and benches along the promenade's length. Polygonal-shaped platforms are at each end of the promenade. At the north end of the promenade is a fence that separates the promenade's end from a rock shelf. The shoreline then curves north, following the old boundary of the former Twin Islands.

== History ==
=== Creation ===
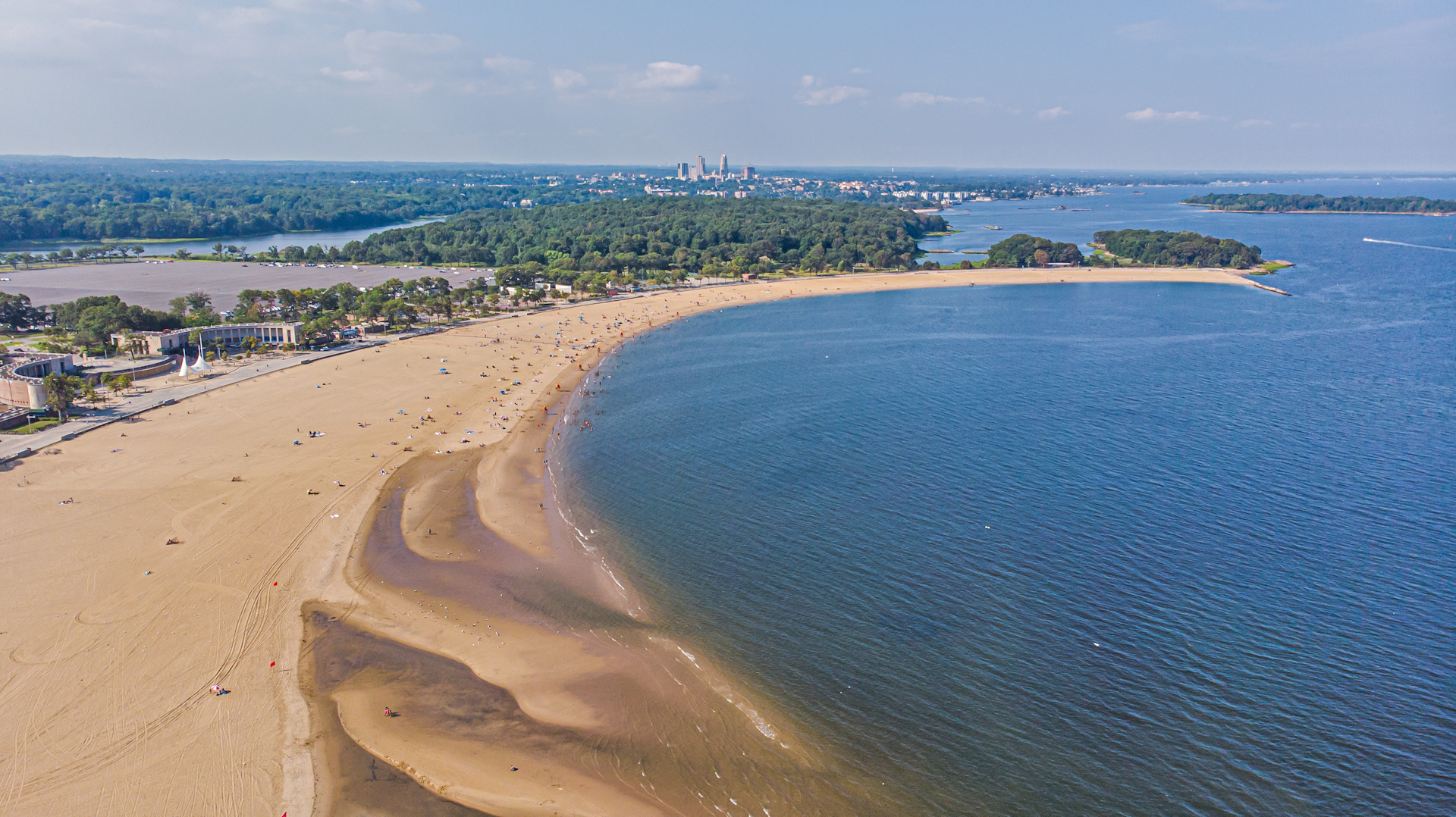
Aerial view of Orchard Beach

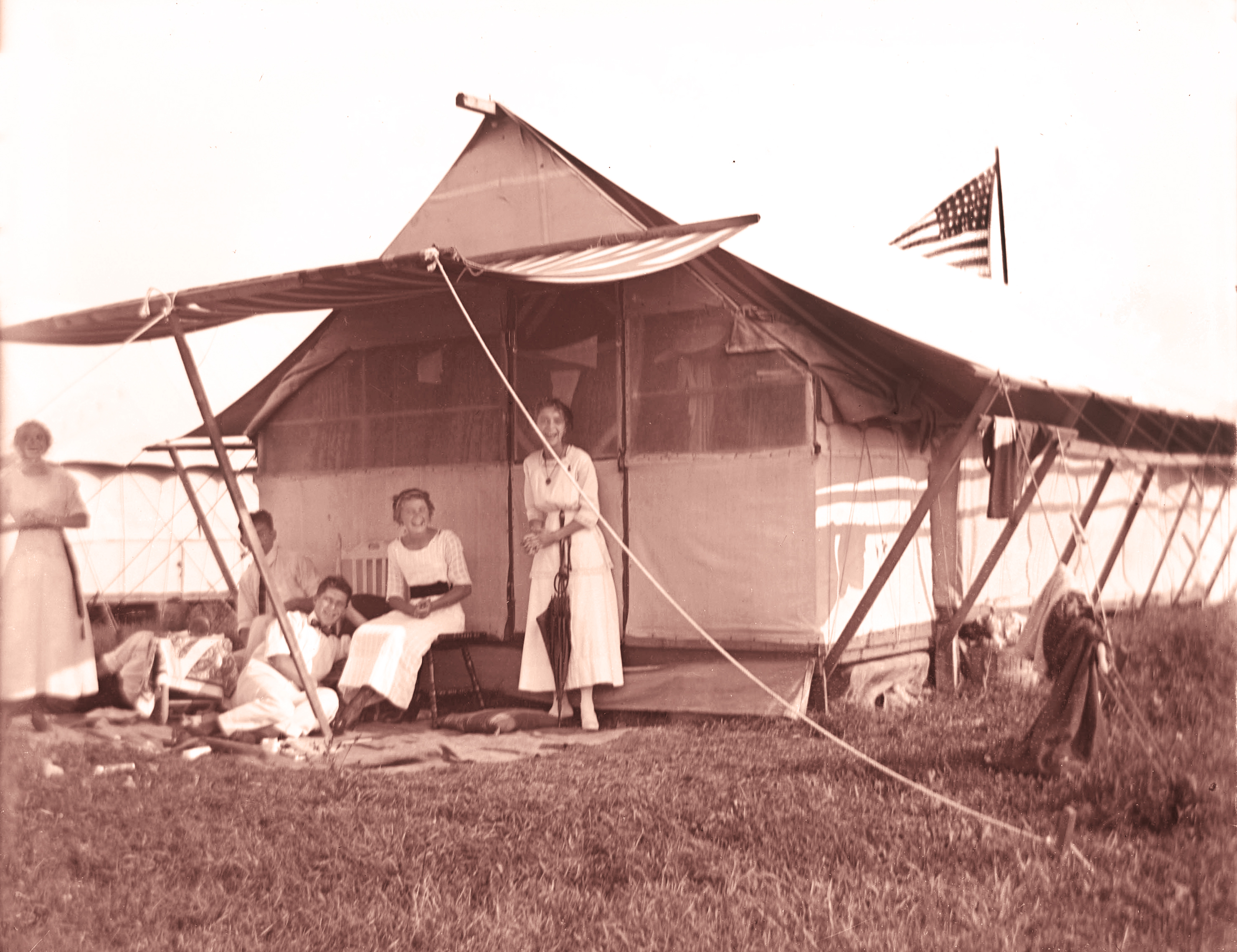
Campsite in 1912

The New York City government acquired the land for Pelham Bay Park in 1887, and the park was officially established in 1888. In early 1902, in order to accommodate vacationers, the New York City Department of Parks and Recreation removed two former houses in Pelham Bay Park and used the remaining wood to build free bathhouses, which were used by about 700 bathers per day during that summer. Around 1903, the nearby Hunter Island became a popular summer vacation destination.

Due to overcrowding on Hunter Island, NYC Parks opened a campsite in 1905 at Rodman's Neck southwest of the island, with 100 bathhouses. At the time, Orchard Beach was a tiny recreational area on the northeast tip of Rodman's Neck. Orchard Beach was extended by 400 feet (120 m) that year, doubling capacity, and a "comfort station" or restroom was added. By 1912, Orchard Beach saw an average of 2,000 visitors on summer weekdays and 5,000 visitors on summer weekends. The beach was a popular destination for summer vacationers.

=== Robert Moses expansion ===
The current Orchard Beach recreational area was created through the efforts of Robert Moses in 1934, and was built along with the Split Rock golf course. Fiorello La Guardia had become the mayor of New York City and named Moses as the city's Parks Commissioner. Immediately after his position was announced, Moses ordered engineers to inventory every park in the city to see what needed renovating. He devised plans for a new Orchard Beach recreation area after he saw the popularity of the Hunter Island campsite. At the time, the beach was a narrow sand bar connecting Hunter Island and Rodman's Neck. There was a retaining wall behind the sand bar, and breakwaters allowed water from the Long Island Sound to pass through the sand bar. The retaining wall frequently flooded at high tide, which made the sand bar effectively unusable most of the time. There were approximately 600 families using the bungalows near the sand bar, as well as 30-foot-high (9.1 m) bathhouses made of granite pavers.

On February 28, 1934, Moses announced a plan for an upgraded beach at Pelham Bay, which had been inspired by the design of Jones Beach on Long Island. The beach would be reconstructed through the Works Progress Administration (WPA) under the 1930s New Deal program, along with another project to construct the nearby Pelham Bay Golf Course. Moses canceled 625 camping leases in March 1934 so the beach could be built on the land. Most of the campers were connected to the Tammany Hall political structure that had ruled the city at one point. Campers protested to the mayor but to no avail. Campers subsequently filed a lawsuit against the city, which concerned Moses's right to cancel the leases. The courts ruled in favor of the city in May 1934, and the site was cleared of campers in June.

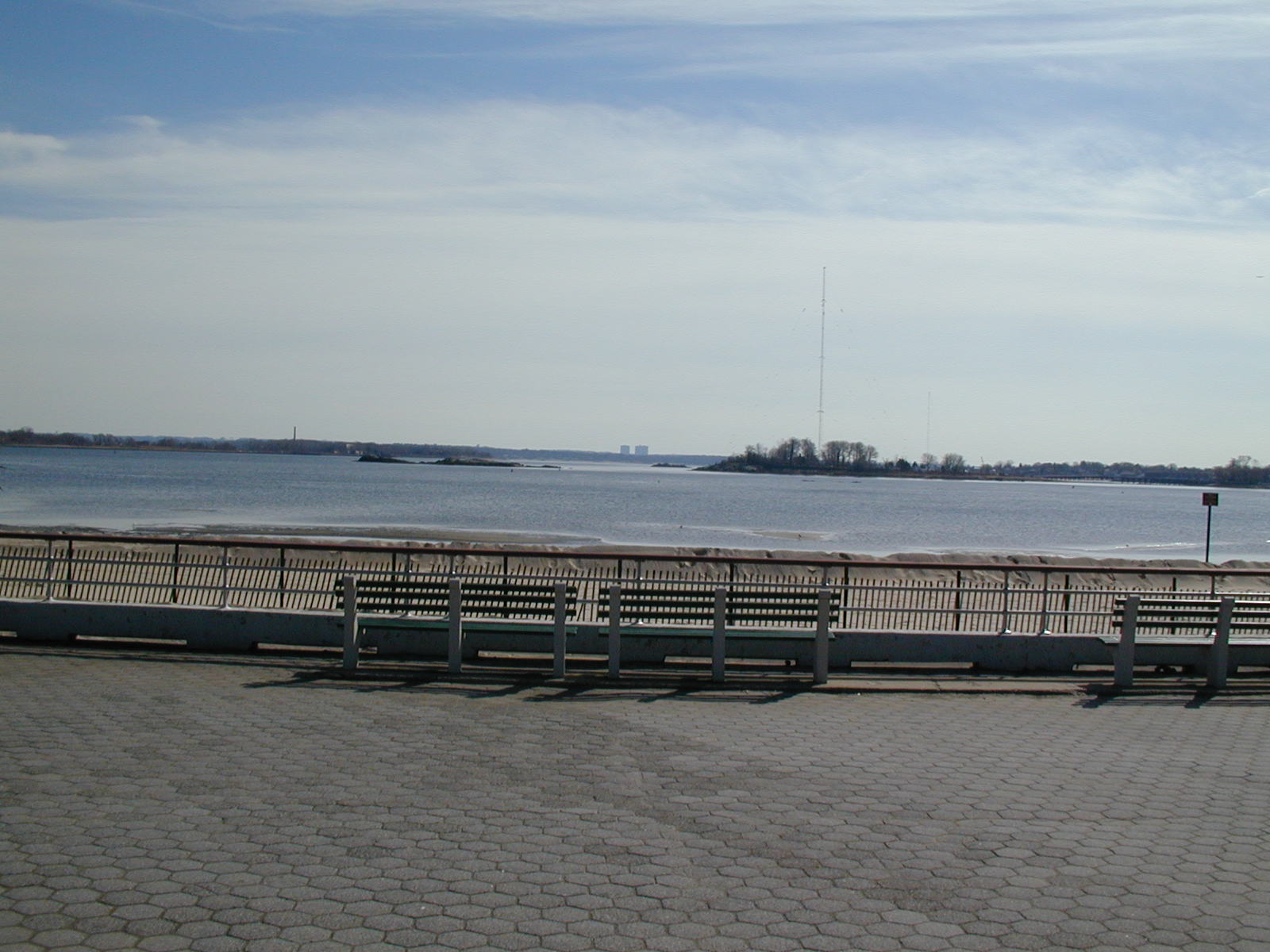
Facing south

To make the beach longer and more perfectly crescent-shaped, Moses decided that Hunter Island and the Twin Islands be connected to Rodman's Neck by filling in most of LeRoy's Bay, located west of Hunter Island. The deteriorated Hunter Mansion was demolished with the construction of the beach. The beach project involved filling in approximately 110 acres (45 ha) of LeRoy's and Pelham Bays with landfill, followed by a total of 4,000,000 cubic yards (3,100,000 m^{3}) of sand brought by barge from Sandy Hook, New Jersey, and the Rockaway Peninsula in Queens. Moses had originally wanted to use sand for the new land, but thought that waste from the New York City Department of Sanitation would be cheaper to use, so the material of choice was switched to landfill. Work on placing the fill began in early 1935, but officials opposed the use of garbage to fill in the land. The landfill was placed among Rodman's Neck, the Twin Islands, and Hunter Island. After the garbage began washing onto the beach through the as-yet-incomplete seawall, work on the filling operation was halted. The board allocated $500,000 (equivalent to $11,700,000 in 2025) for 1,700,000 cubic yards (1,300,000 m^{3}) of sand, and the rest of the land reclamation project was done using sand from Sandy Hook and the Rockaways. The sand-filling operations officially began in April 1936. Two seawalls were built: one made of boulders on the east side of the fill facing Pelham Bay, and a smaller wall on the west side facing LeRoy's Bay, now a lagoon. The fill was then landscaped with flowers, shrubs, and various genera of trees, while the naturally planted chestnut, oak, hickory, black locust, and black cherry trees on either side of the fill were kept as is.

The beach was dedicated in July 1936 despite only being partially complete. The dedication attracted an estimated 18,000 beach-goers. Orchard Beach was set to open along with the upgraded Jacob Riis Park in Queens on June 19, 1937, but the openings were pushed back due to unfinished work. Both beaches were opened on June 25, 1937, the day after the opening of the Crotona Park Play Center. The opening was marked by a fireworks display that drew 15,000 spectators. The bathhouse pavilion at Pelham Bay Park also opened that year. Orchard Beach was completed in 1938. Later that year, the bathhouse and beach were damaged by the powerful 1938 New England hurricane. Sewage from nearby City Island also seeped onto the beach, and Moses threatened to close the beach until the city agreed to build a new sewage pipe for the island.

=== Later changes ===
==== 20th century ====
In 1939, one year after the beach was completed, there were plans to expand the beach. The southern locker room was the first to be renovated, with a 150-foot (46 m) extension in 1939. Work was halted from 1941 to 1945 due to World War II. The water between Hunter and Twin Islands was filled in during 1946 and 1947, with new jetties at each end of the beach. The promenade was extended over the fill, gaining its current hexagonal tiles as well as refurbished concession buildings. The extension, opened in May 1947, consisted of 7 acres (2.8 ha) of new land and 5 acres (2.0 ha) of restored beach. Further improvements were made to the bathhouse pavilion in 1952 and to the northern jetty in 1955. Some ticket windows were installed in 1958, and a new concession stand was added north of the pavilion in 1962. The beach was renovated starting in 1964.

A proposal for a 3,300-seat outdoor theater at Pelham Bay Park, replacing Orchard Beach's northern locker facility, was canceled in 1974 due to community opposition. In 1980, NYC Parks proposed a renovation of the beach for its 50th anniversary. By then, the beach had become so rundown that there was garbage covering much of the sand, and there were prostitutes and gamblers along the promenade. The $1 million renovation of the pavilions (equivalent to $2,937,000 in 2025) was completed by 1986. After the renovation, the pavilions contained some shops and fast food, with a nature center and museum planned for the buildings. In 1985, parts of Orchard Beach, as well as three other city beaches and Central Park's Sheep Meadow, were designated as "quiet zones" where loud radio-playing was prohibited.

A second renovation of Orchard Beach started in 1995, with a new sand-filling project to replace the sand that had been lost since the last such project in 1964. Gandhi Engineering oversaw the restoration of the pavilion. Around the same time, a proposal for a water park at Orchard Beach was revealed as part of a plan to bring visitors back to the beach. That proposal was effectively canceled in 1999 due to large opposition from City Island residents.

==== 21st century ====
In the mid-2000s, as part of the city's ultimately unsuccessful bid for the 2012 Summer Olympics, several facilities in Pelham Bay Park were proposed for upgrades. The city had planned to renovate the beach's pavilion at a cost of $23 million, with the south wing being used for fencing and the north wing for swimming and water polo. Both the pavilions and the beach were designated as landmarks by the New York City Landmarks Preservation Commission (LPC) in 2006. The deteriorating 170,000-square-foot (16,000 m^{2}) eastern bathhouse pavilion, which had been neglected since the 1970s, was closed in 2007 and fenced off in 2009. The similarly sized west bathhouse started undergoing $7 million in repairs. In 2010, construction began on extending the jetty at Orchard Beach. Approximately 250,000 to 268,000 cubic yards (191,000 to 205,000 m^{3}) of sand were pumped onto the beach to replace sand lost over the years. The jetty project cost $13 million, of which the United States Army Corps of Engineers (USACE) paid $7 million and NYC Parks paid $6 million.

Proposals to renovate Orchard Beach's bathhouse pavilions surfaced in the late 2010s, and some funding was provided starting in 2016; The next year, $50 million had been procured to fund the full renovation of the pavilion; by 2019, there was $75 million available for the renovation. In mid-2020, a drive-in movie theater was set up at Orchard Beach's parking lot. Plans for the renovation had been paused during the COVID-19 pandemic, but Marvel Architects resumed planning for the renovation in May 2021. The work was tentatively scheduled to be finished in 2023 or 2024. Following an influx of asylum seekers to New York City in mid-2022, city officials announced that September that they would construct temporary housing for asylum seekers within Orchard Beach's parking lot. After the parking lot flooded during a minor rainstorm that October, the migrant center was relocated to Randalls Island.

Work on the restoration of the Orchard Beach pavilion began in December 2022, at which point the project was to cost $87 million. The work included new ramps and concessions, as well as repairs to the roof and the addition of trees and lamps. The project's cost had increased to $100 million by mid-2024, at which point the first phase of renovation was planned to be completed in a year. NYC Parks and the New York City Economic Development Corporation submitted plans to the LPC in August 2025, proposing modifications to the pavilion, which included the restoration of the original design features. The pavilions reopened in May 2026; in total, the project had cost $114 million.

== Transportation ==
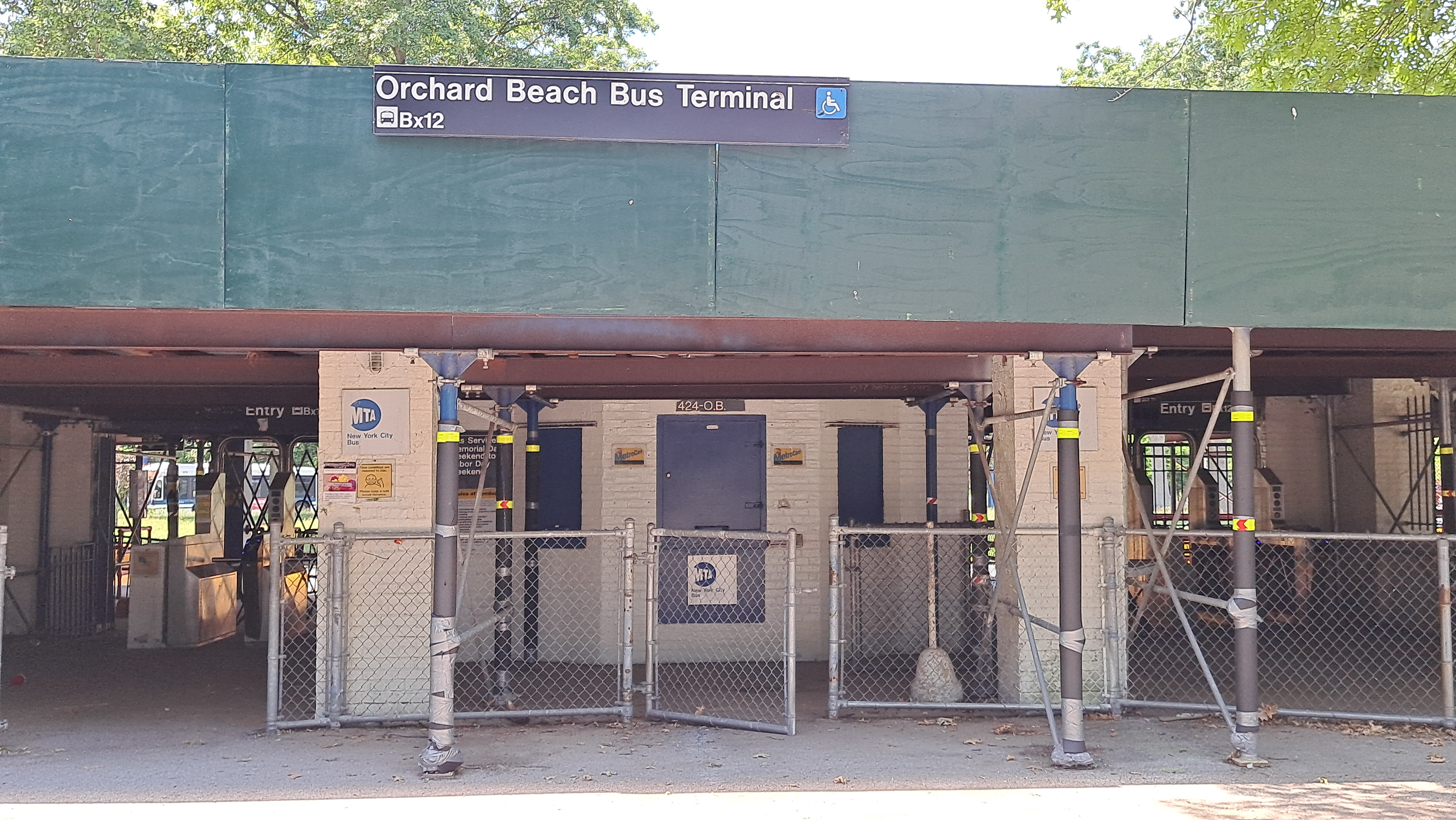
Orchard Beach Bus Terminal in 2022

MTA Regional Bus Operations's Bx12 bus serves Orchard Beach during summer weekends. The Bx29 bus to City Island runs nearby year-round. The New York City Subway's Pelham Bay Park station, serving the 6 and <6> trains, is across the Hutchinson River.

== Notable people ==
Frank Pia, known for devising the Pia carry method for holding drowning swimmers, was a chief lifeguard of Orchard Beach in the late 20th century.

== See also ==
- List of beaches in the United States
- List of New York City Designated Landmarks in the Bronx
