= Amphipoea senilis =

Scientific classification
- Domain: Eukaryota
- Kingdom: Animalia
- Phylum: Arthropoda
- Class: Insecta
- Order: Lepidoptera
- Superfamily: Noctuoidea
- Family: Noctuidae
- Genus: Amphipoea
- Species: A. senilis

Binomial name
- Amphipoea senilis (Smith, 1892)

Synonyms
- Amphipoea flavostigma (Barnes & Benjamin, 1924)

Species of moth

Amphipoea senilis is a species of cutworm or dart moth in the family Noctuidae. It was first described by Smith in 1892 and it is found in North America.

The MONA or Hodges number for Amphipoea senilis is 9459.
