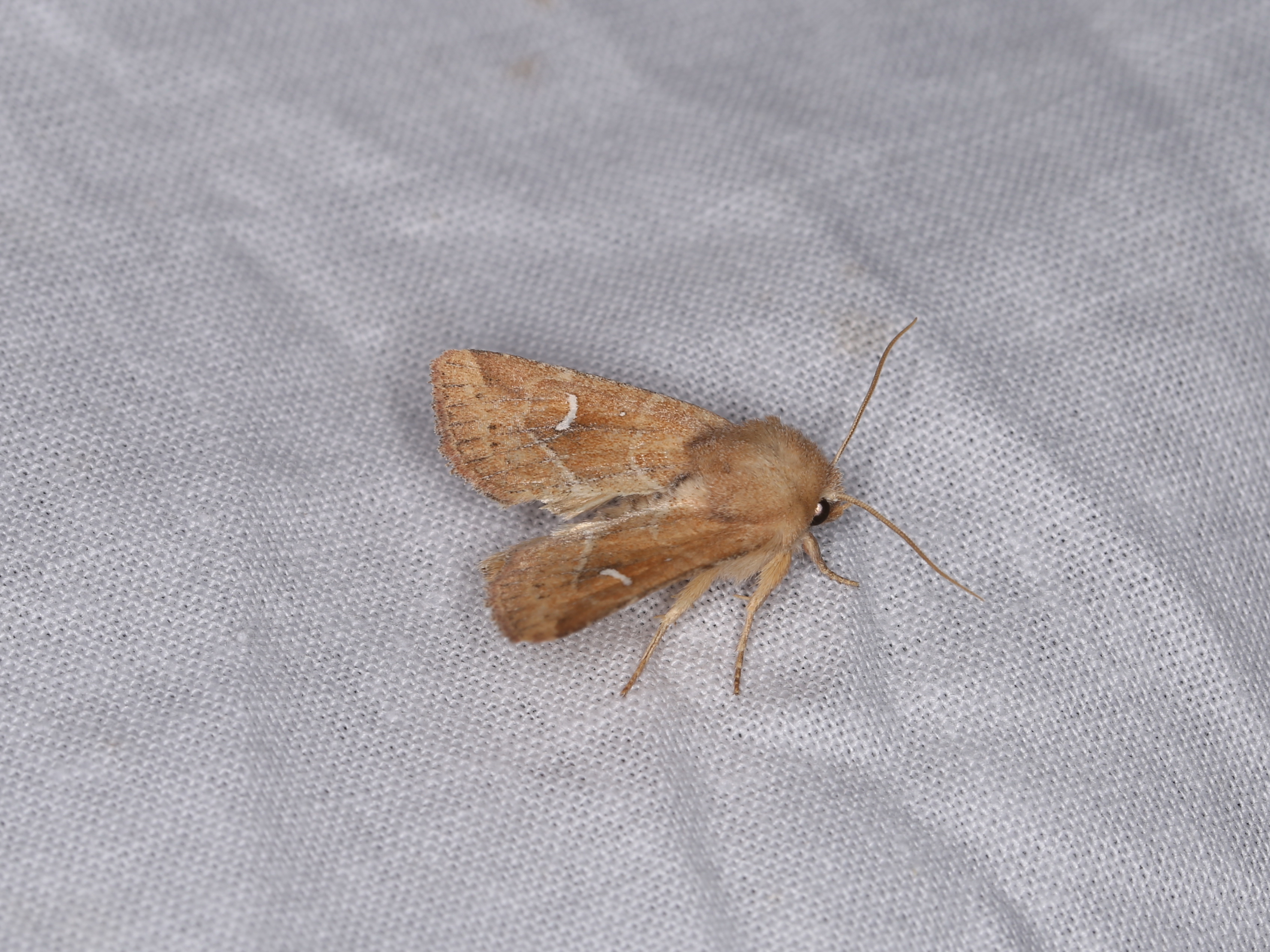

Scientific classification
- Domain: Eukaryota
- Kingdom: Animalia
- Phylum: Arthropoda
- Class: Insecta
- Order: Lepidoptera
- Superfamily: Noctuoidea
- Family: Noctuidae
- Genus: Amphipoea
- Species: A. lunata

Binomial name
- Amphipoea lunata (Smith, 1891)

= Amphipoea lunata =

Species of moth

Amphipoea lunata is a species of moth in the family Noctuidae first described by Smith in 1891. It is found in North America.

The MONA or Hodges number for Amphipoea lunata is 9455.
