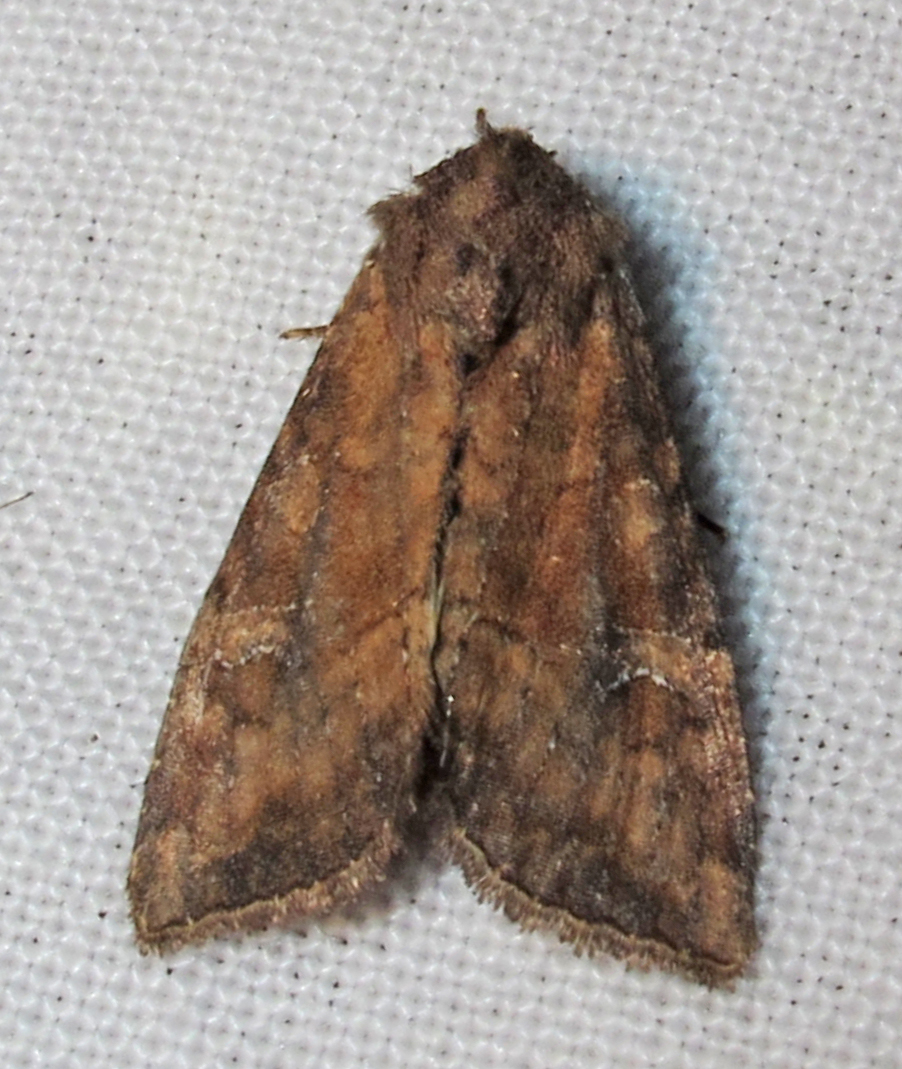

Scientific classification
- Kingdom: Animalia
- Phylum: Arthropoda
- Class: Insecta
- Order: Lepidoptera
- Superfamily: Noctuoidea
- Family: Noctuidae
- Tribe: Apameini
- Genus: Loscopia
- Species: L. velata

Binomial name
- Loscopia velata (Walker, 1865)

= Loscopia velata =

Species of moth

Loscopia velata, the veiled ear moth, is a species of cutworm or dart moth in the family Noctuidae.

The MONA or Hodges number for Loscopia velata is 9454.

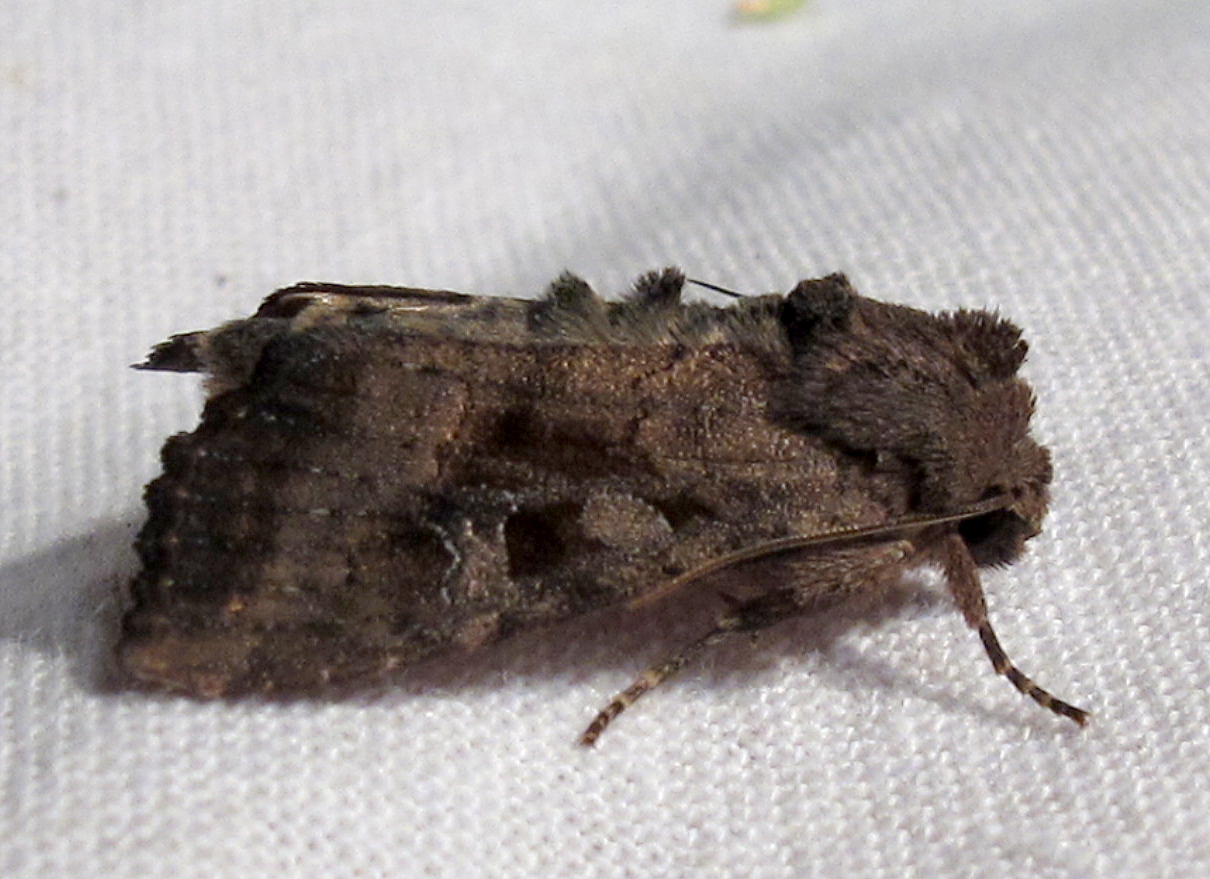
Veiled ear moth, Loscopia velata
