= Adolph Speyer =

German entomologist (1812–1892)

Adolph Speyer (28 April 1812, Arolsen – 14 October 1892, Rhoden, Waldeck ) was a German entomologist who specialised in Lepidoptera, especially Hesperiidae.

Dr. Adolph Speyer wrote more than 70 papers on butterflies and their distribution.

== Works ==
partial list

- Speyer, A. (1848): Kritische Bemerkungen zu Herrich-Schäffer's systematischer Bearbeitung der Schmetterlinge von Europa, als Text, Revision und Supplement zu Hübner's europäischen Schmetterlingen. Erster Band. Tagschmetterlinge. Regensburg 1845. Entomologische Zeitung. Herausgegeben von dem entomologischen Vereine zu Stettin 9 (3), pp. [67–76.]
- Speyer, A. (1848): Kritische Bemerkungen zu Herrich-Schäffer's systematischer Bearbeitung der europäischen Schmetterlinge. Entomologische Zeitung. Herausgegeben von dem entomologischen Vereine zu Stettin 9 (5), pp. [136–144.]
- Speyer, A. (1851): Eine Excursion auf den Patscher Kofel bei Innsbruck Entomologische Zeitung. Herausgegeben von dem entomologischen Vereine zu Stettin 12 (11), pp. [329–340.]
- Speyer, A. (1858): Verzeichniss der im Fürstenthume Waldeck im geflügelten Zustande überwinternden Schmetterlinge. Entomologische Zeitung. Herausgegeben von dem entomologischen Vereine zu Stettin 19 (1/3), pp. [74–83.]
- Speyer, A. (1860): Einige lepidopterologische Beobachtungen und Bemerkungen. Entomologische Zeitung. Herausgegeben von dem entomologischen Vereine zu Stettin 21 (10/12), pp. [369–375.]
- Speyer, A. & Speyer, A. ., 1862: Die geographische Verbreitung der Schmetterlinge Deutschland und Schweiz (zweiter Teil). Verlag von Wilhelm Engelmann, pp. 320, Leipzig.
- Speyer, A. (1865) _- Entomologische Zeitung. Herausgegeben von dem entomologischen Vereine zu Stettin 26 (7/9), pp. [241–268.]
- Speyer, A. (1866): Lepidopterologische Mittheilungen. Entomologische Zeitung. Herausgegeben von dem entomologischen Vereine zu Stettin 28 (1/3), pp. [65–76.]
- Speyer, A. (1878): Die Hesperiden-Gattungen die Europäischen Faunengebietz. Stett. ent. Ztg 39(1–6), pp. [167–193]
- Speyer, A. (Aug 1878): The genera of the Hesperiidae of the European faunal region. [Translation of paper from Stett. ent. Ztg]. – Can. Ent. 10(8), pp. [121–129, ( ):144–154, ( ):163–170]
- Speyer, A. (1879): Neue Hesperiden des paläarctischen Faunengebiets. Stett. ent. Ztg40, pp. [342–352]
- Speyer, A. (1879): Die Hesperiden-Gattungen des Europäischen Faunengebiets II. Nachträge. Das Flügelgeäder. Stett. ent. Ztg 40(10–12), pp. [477–500]
- Speyer, A. (1880) with Phillipp Klier Deutsche Schmetterlingskunde für Anfänger. Nebst einer Anleitung zum Sammeln, von Dr. A. Speyer. Leipzig, Oehmigke [1880] online
- Speyer, A. (Sep 1882): Lepidopterologische Bemerkungen. Stett. ent. Ztg. 43(7–9), pp. [375–388]
