= Moth trap =

Trap used to catch insects

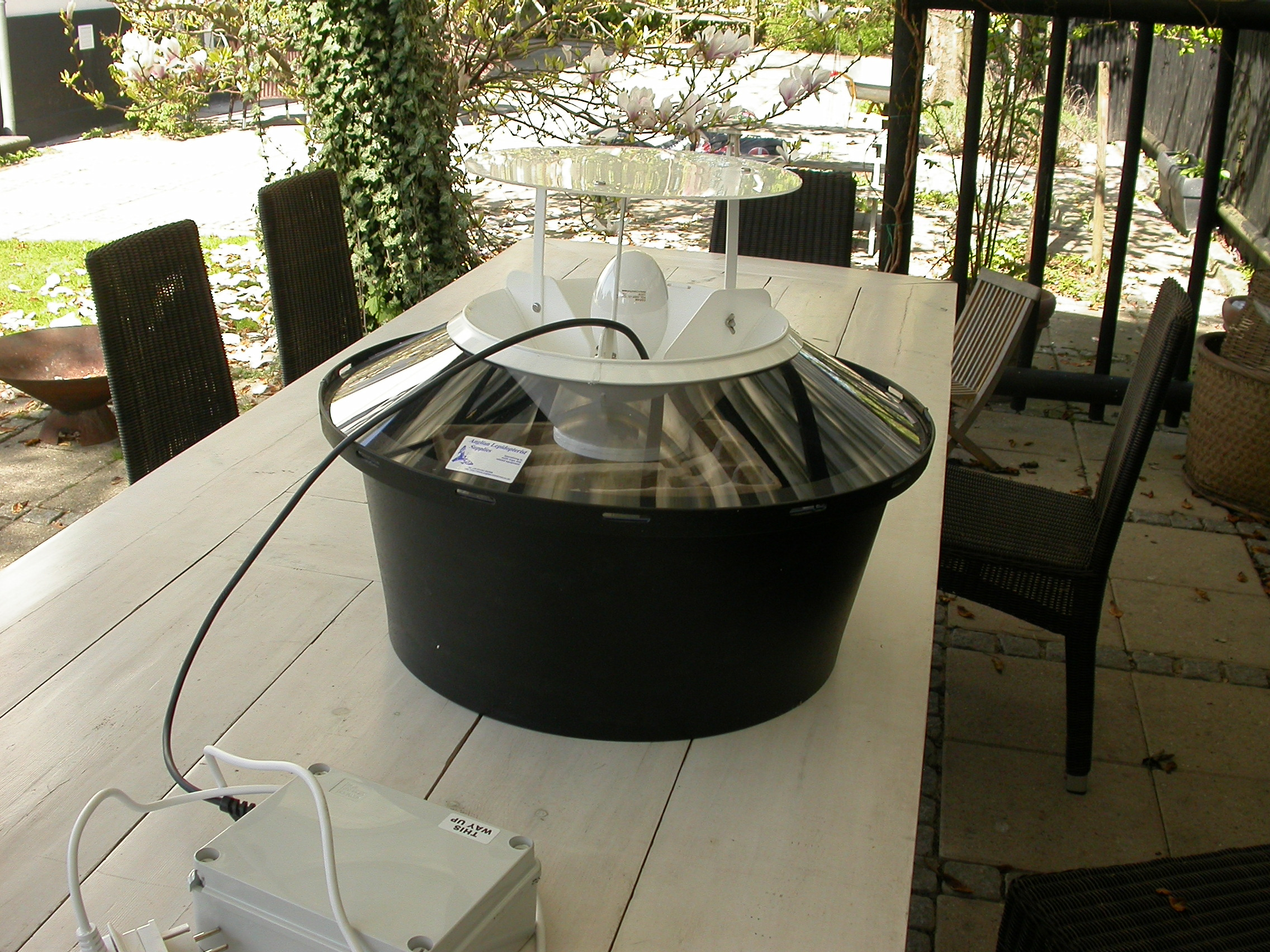
A commercially produced Robinson trap.

Moth traps are devices used for capturing moths for scientific research or domestic pest control.

Entomologists use moth traps to study moth populations, behavior, distribution, and role in ecosystems, contributing to biodiversity conservation and ecological monitoring efforts.

Homeowners, on the other hand, employ moth traps to protect their homes from moth infestations, particularly clothes moths and pantry moths, which can cause significant damage to textiles and contaminate stored food products.

== Use in entomology ==
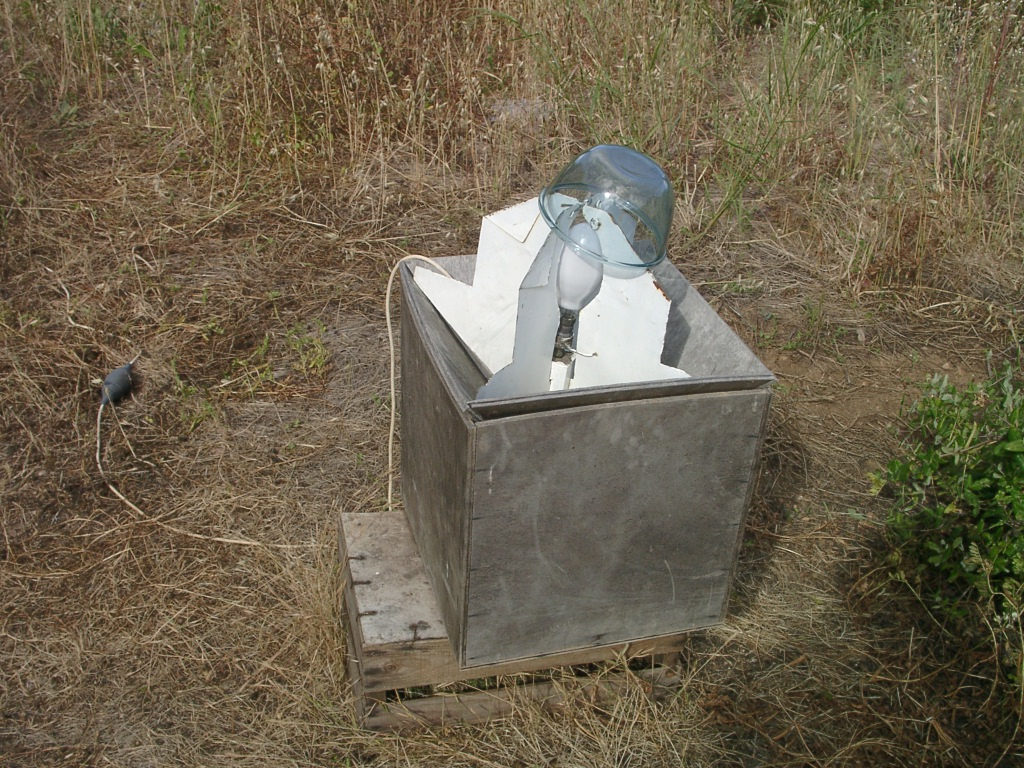
A simple light trap

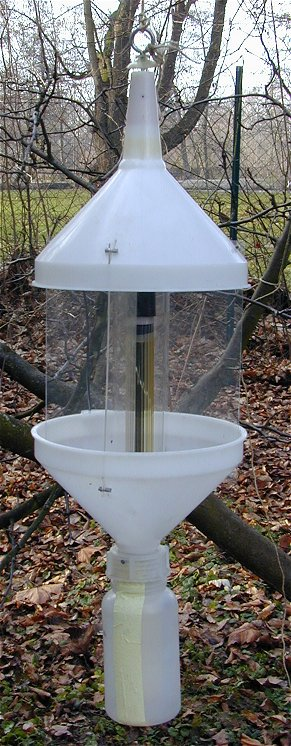
A more complex moth trap

Entomologists primarily use light-based moth traps, which exploit the phototactic behavior of moths, attracting them to a light source. Moths navigate by using natural light sources such as the moon and stars, and artificial light sources can confuse and draw them in. The moths are then captured in a container, allowing researchers to identify and record the species present without causing harm. Various trapping methods and designs are employed, including mercury vapor light traps, actinic light traps, and LED light traps, to cater to different research objectives, environmental conditions, and target moth species. These traps often feature modifications to minimize bycatch and ensure minimal disturbance to non-target organisms, demonstrating a responsible and ethical approach to scientific research.

All moth traps follow the same basic design - consisting of a mercury vapour or actinic light to attract the moths and a box in which the moths can accumulate and be examined later. The moths fly towards the light and spiral down towards the source of the light and are deflected into the box. Besides moths, several other insects will also come to light, such as scarab beetles, Ichneumonid wasps, stink bugs, stick insects, diving beetles, and water boatmen. Occasionally diurnal species such as dragonflies, yellowjacket wasps, and hover flies will also visit. The reason insects, and especially particular families of insects (e.g. moths), are attracted to light is uncertain. The most accepted theory is that moths migrate using the moon and stars as navigational aids, and that the placement of a closer-than-the-moon light causes subtended angles of light at the insect's eye to alter so rapidly that it has to fly in a spiral to reduce the angular change. This results in the insect flying into the artificial light. Yet the reason some diurnal insects visit is entirely unknown.

Some moths, notably Sesiidae are monitored or collected using pheromone traps.

== Pest control ==
Moth traps for household use are designed to target specific moth species that cause damage to clothing, carpets, and stored food products.

== See also ==
- Bug zapper
- Mosquito net
