= Gustaf Johan Billberg =

Swedish botanist, zoologist and anatomist

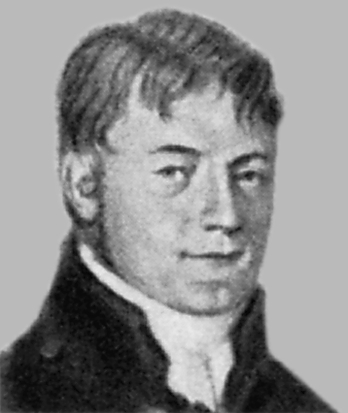
Billberg

Gustaf Johan Billberg (14 June 1772, Karlskrona – 26 November 1844, Stockholm) was a Swedish botanist, zoologist and anatomist, although professionally and by training he was a lawyer and used science and biology as an avocation. The plant genus Billbergia was named for him by Carl Peter Thunberg.

== Biography ==
In 1790 he earned his legal degree at the University of Lund, later working as an auditor at the audit chamber in Stockholm from 1793. In 1798 he became a member of the county administrative board (landskamrerare) in Visby. In 1808 he returned to Stockholm, where from 1812 to 1837, he served as a member of the administrative court (kammarrättsråd). He was promoted in 1824 to head the ministry of the Board of Customs (generaltullstyrelsen).

In 1812, he purchased the right of publishing to the precious work of Svensk Botanik from the estate of Johan Wilhelm Palmstruch. He subsequently prepared two parts for publication during 1812–1819. He was elected member of the Royal Swedish Academy of Sciences in 1817.

== Selected works ==
Billberg was the author of the following works:

- Monographia mylabridum (1813)
- Ekonomisk botanik (1815)
- Enumeratio insectorum in museo (1820)
- Synopsis Faunae Scandinaviae (1827)
