= New York–New Jersey Harbor Estuary =

One of the most intricate natural harbors in the world

Coordinates: 40°31′00″N 74°02′59″W

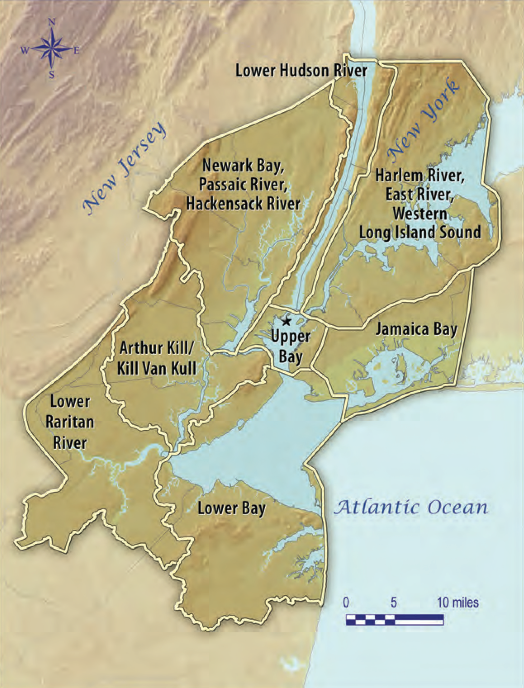
A 2016 U.S. Army Corps of Engineers map showing New York–New Jersey Harbor Estuary's drainage divide and drainage basin

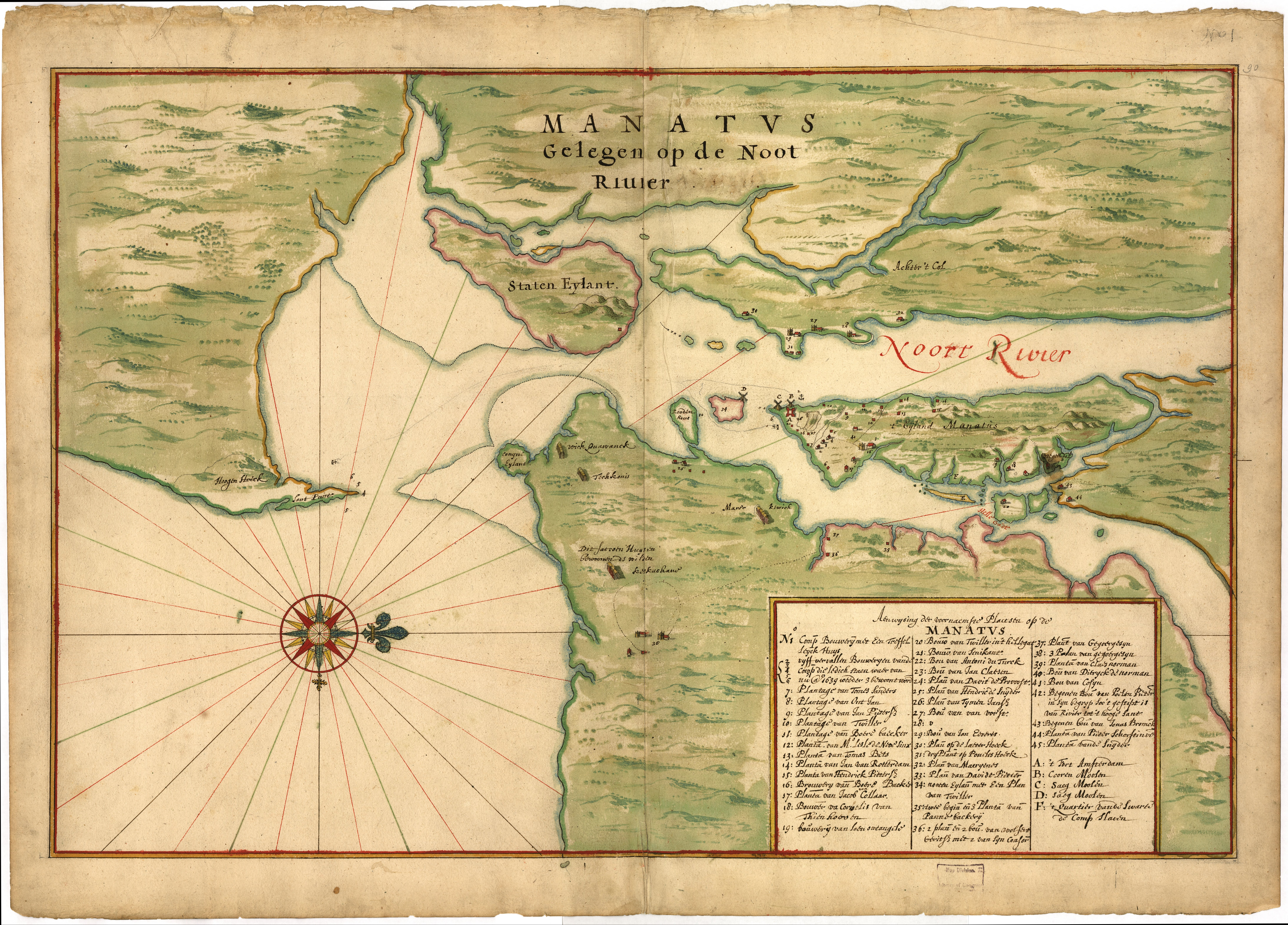
Harrisse/LOC copy of the Manatus Map of 1639

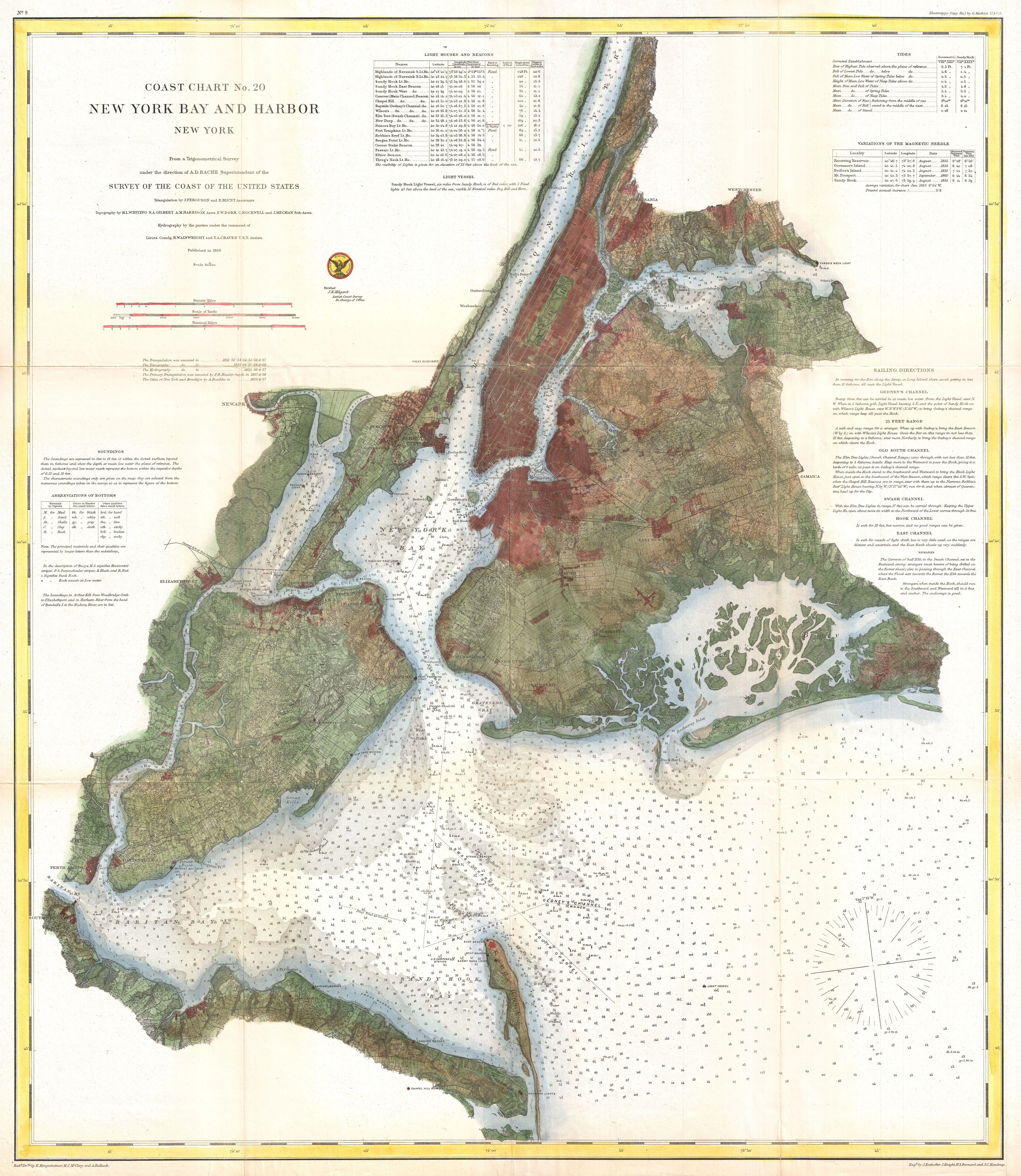
An 1866 map of New York–New Jersey Harbor Estuary

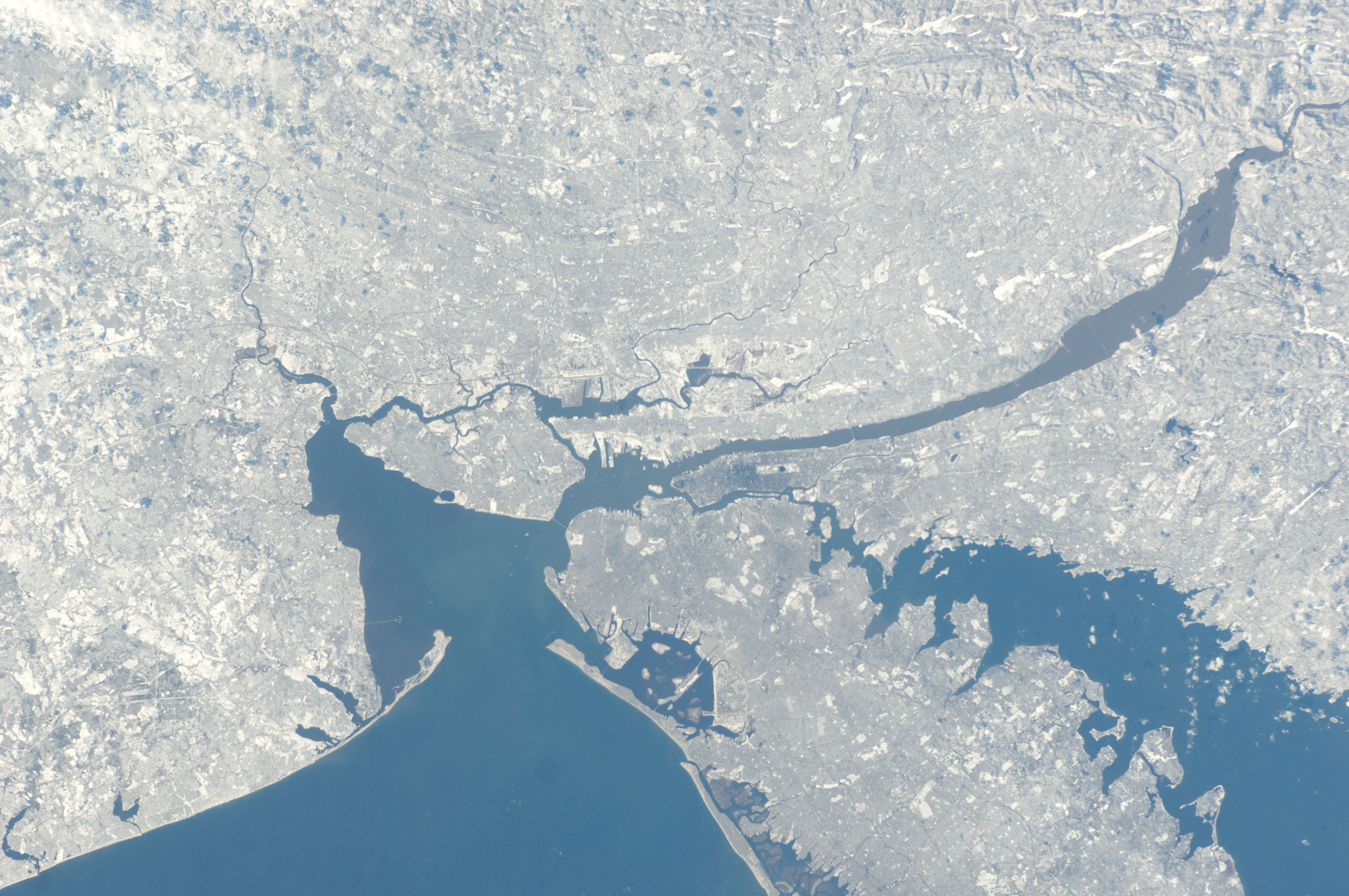
A 2011 NASA image of New York–New Jersey Harbor Estuary

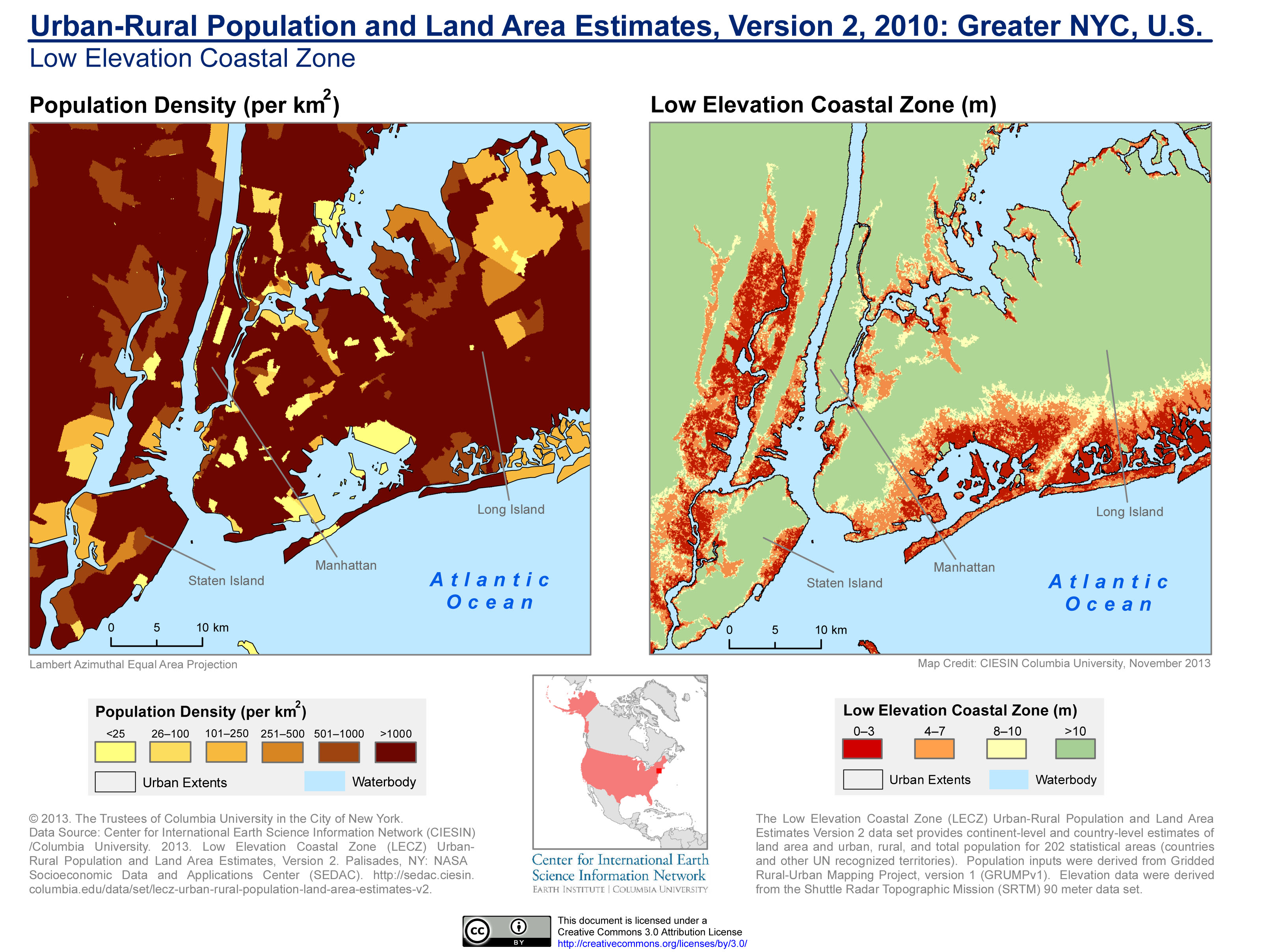
Population density and elevation above sea level in the New York City metropolitan area as of 2010

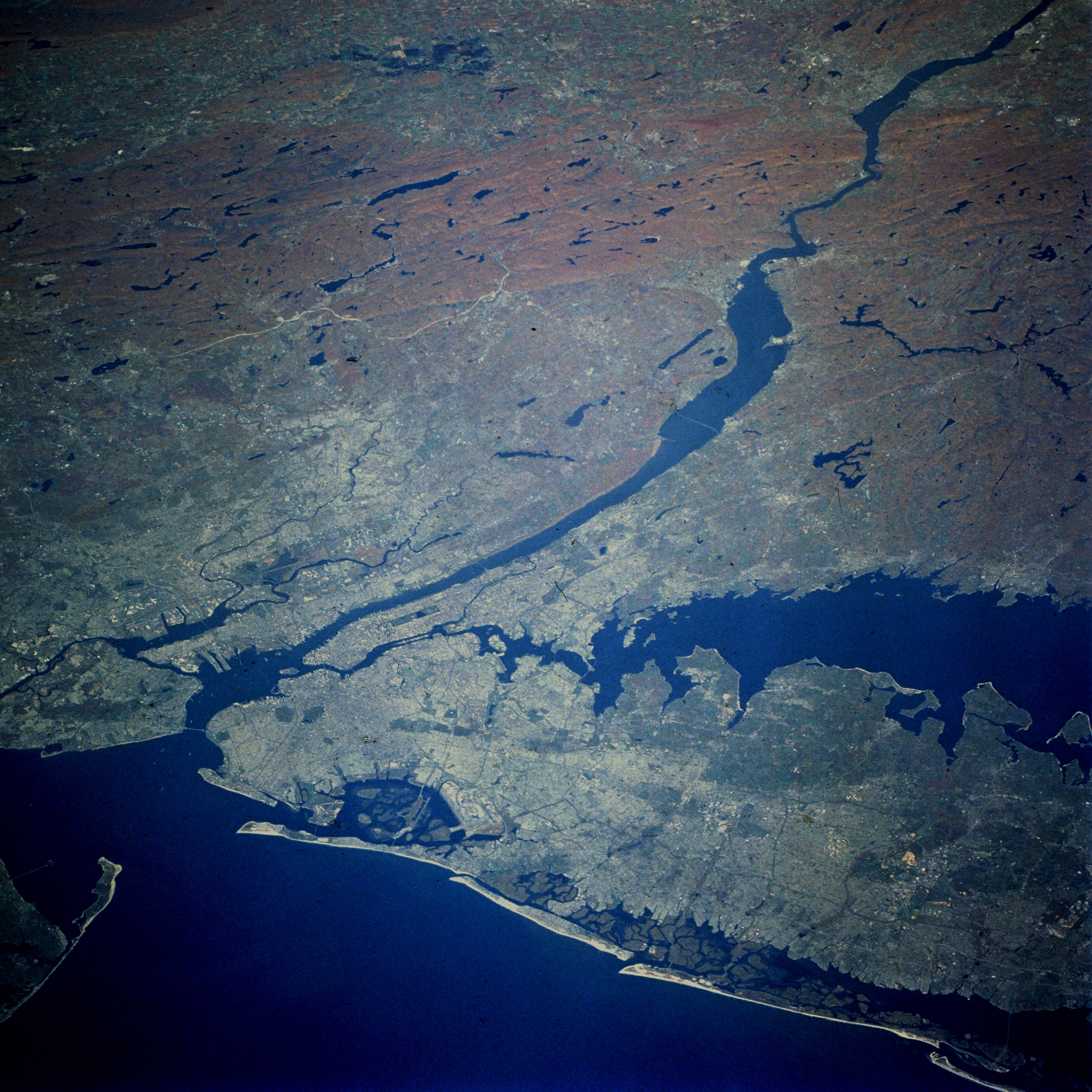
An aerial view of New York–New Jersey Harbor Estuary

The New York–New Jersey Harbor Estuary, also known as the Hudson–Raritan Estuary, is in the northeastern states of New Jersey and New York on the East Coast of the United States. The system of waterways of the Port of New York and New Jersey forms one of the most intricate natural harbors in the world and one of the busiest ports of the United States. The harbor opens onto the New York Bight in the Atlantic Ocean to the southeast and Long Island Sound to the northeast.

Although the overall form of the estuary remains unchanged from the time of Giovanni da Verrazzano's visit in 1524, all parts have changed at least a little, and some parts, such as Hell Gate and Ellis Island, have been almost completely altered. In the greatest hidden change, the navigational channels have been deepened from the natural 17 feet (5.2 m) depth to 45 feet (14 m). In some places this required blasting of bedrock.

There is an extremely complex system of tides and currents. Both the Bight and the Sound are essentially marine bodies with tides and saltwater, but the Sound compared to the Atlantic is about 20–30% less saline (as an estuary), and the tide is about 3 hours later with as much as 70% more variation. Rivers add a fresher, non-tidal inflow although the tide and brackishness extend well up rivers throughout the extended hydrologic system from Albany to Montauk Point to the Hudson Canyon region of the New York Bight. The New York Harbor Observing and Prediction System (NYHOPS) utilizes information from sensors, weather forecasts, and environment models to provide real-time forecasts of meteorological and oceanographic conditions in the area.

Since the Ash Wednesday Storm of 1962 beaches along the shores of the East Coast have been regularly replenished with sand pumped in from off-shore. The United States Army Corps of Engineers (USACE) coordinates the projects.

In 2016, USACE and the Port Authority of New York and New Jersey produced a comprehensive restoration plan for the New York Harbor region, with proposals to mitigate the effects of sea level rise through projects to restore natural areas. In September the USACE released the New York New Jersey Harbor and Tributaries Study (HATS).

== Features of the harbor estuary ==
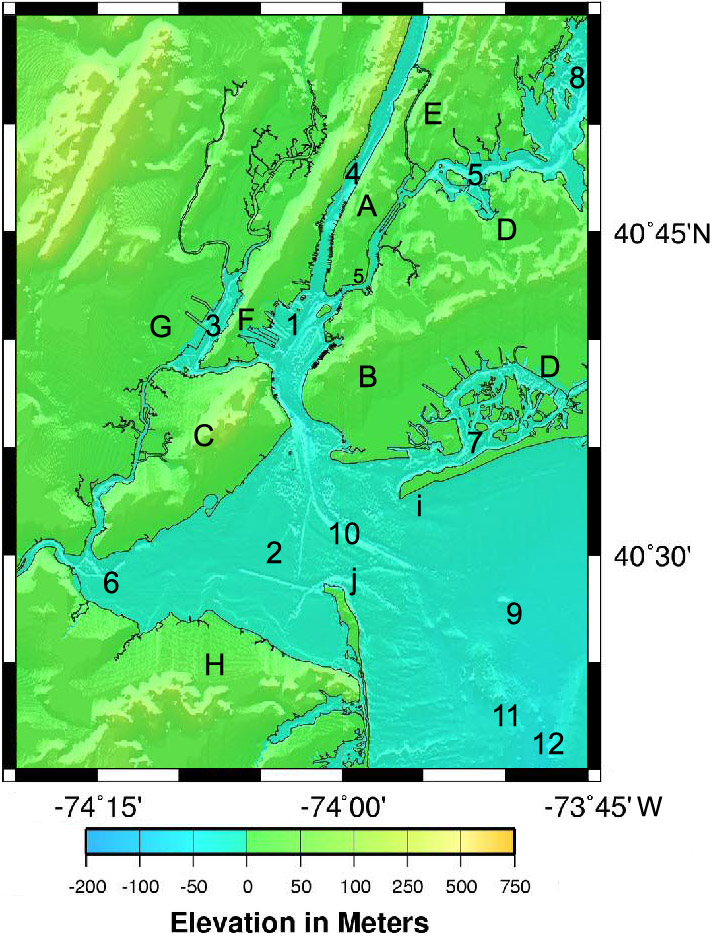
1. Upper New York Bay; 2. Lower New York Bay; 3. Newark Bay; 4. Hudson River; 5. East River; 6. Raritan Bay; 7. Jamaica Bay; 8. Long Island Sound; 9. New York Bight-North Atlantic; 10. Ambrose Channel; 11. Mud Dump Site; 12. Hudson Canyon; A. Manhattan B. Brooklyn C. Staten Island D. Queens E. The Bronx F. Bayonne-Jersey City G. Newark H. Raritan Bayshore i. Rockaway Point j. Sandy Hook (This is not for navigation.)

The lists below includes features of the Port of New York and New Jersey with a waterborne emphasis, starting with natural features. Where possible the list proceeds from the Lower Bay entrance approximately clockwise around the harbor. The alternative sorting is by jurisdiction.

Official references are the NOAA Coastal pilot, NOAA nautical charts, and USGS topographic maps. Many jurisdictional issues appear in U.S. law.

== Rivers and streams ==
Bi-state

- Hackensack River
- Hudson River (lowest section also called the North River)

New Jersey

- Berrys Creek
- Dwars Kill
- Elizabeth River
- Overpeck Creek
- Navesink River
- Passaic River
  - First River (a.k.a. Mill Brook)
  - Second River
  - Third River
- Rahway River
- Raritan River
- Shrewsbury River
- Morses Creek
- Piles Creek
- Woodbridge River

New York

- Alley Creek
- Bronx River
- Byram River
- Coney Island Creek
- Flushing River
- Fresh Kills
- Gerritsen Creek
- Glen Cove Creek
- Gowanus Canal (formerly Gowanus Creek)
- Hawtree Creek
- Hook Creek
  - Clear Stream
  - Valley Stream Brook
- Hutchinson River
- Luyster Creek
- Main Creek
- Mamaroneck River
- Mianus River
- Motts Creek
- Newtown Creek
  - Dutch Kills
  - English Kills
  - Maspeth Creek
  - Whale Creek
- Richmond Creek
- Sherman Creek
- Simonsons Creek
- Smith Creek
- Springville Creek
- Stannards Brook
- Tibbetts Brook

== Tidal straits ==
Inter-state

- Arthur Kill
- Kill Van Kull
- Long Island Sound

New York

- Bronx Kill
- Buttermilk Channel
- East River
- Grass Hassock Channel
- Harlem River
- Hell Gate
- The Narrows
- Pumpkin Patch Channel
- Rockaway Inlet
- Spuyten Duyvil

== Bays, inlets and coves ==
New York Bay

- Lower New York Bay
  - Gravesend Bay
  - Great Hills Harbor
  - Jamaica Bay
    - Bergen Basin
    - Fresh Creek Basin
    - Grassy Bay
    - Head of Bay
      - Thurston Basin
    - Mill Basin
    - Norton Basin
    - Paerdegat Basin
  - Leonardo Harbor
  - Prince's Bay
  - Raritan Bay
    - Sandy Hook Bay
  - Rockaway Inlet
    - Dead Horse Bay
    - Sheepshead Bay
- Upper New York Bay (New York Harbor)
  - Atlantic Basin
  - Communipaw
  - Erie Basin
  - Gowanus Bay
  - Harsimus Cove
  - John's Cove
  - Long Canal
  - Morris Canal Basin
  - Newark Bay
  - Weehawken Cove

East River

- Bowery Bay
- Bushwick Inlet
- Flushing Bay
  - Little Bay
- Hallets Cove
- Newtown Creek
- Powell's Cove
- Wallabout Bay (Navy Yard Basin)
- Westchester Creek

Long Island Sound

- City Island Harbor
- Eastchester Bay
- Hempstead Harbor
- Little Neck Bay
- Manhasset Bay
- Pelham Bay
- Port Chester Harbor

== Islands ==
=== Bi-state ===
- Ellis Island—All of the landfill portion of Ellis Island beyond its 1834 waterfront is in Jersey City, New Jersey, as is all water surrounding Liberty and Ellis Islands. The original island is an exclave in New York State.
- Liberty Island, exclave of New York within surrounding waters of Jersey City
- Shooters Island at head of Kill Van Kull in Newark Bay, part in New Jersey and part in New York

=== New Jersey ===
- Plum Island, Sandy Hook Bay
- Robbins Reef

=== New York ===
Bronx County

- Pelham Islands
  - The Blauzes
  - Chimney Sweeps Islands
  - City Island
  - Hart Island
  - High Island
  - Hunters Island
  - Rat Island
  - Travers Island
  - Twin Island
- North Brother Island
- South Brother Island
- Rikers Island

Kings County

- Long Island

Jamaica Bay islands

- The Canarsie Pol
- Ruffle Bar

New York County

- Manhattan

Upper Bay islands

- Ellis Island
- Governors Island
- Liberty Island

East River islands

- Mill Rock Island
- Randalls and Wards Islands
- Roosevelt Island
- U Thant Island

Queens County

- Long Island

Jamaica Bay islands

- Rulers Bar Hassock

Richmond County

- Staten Island
- Hoffman Island (formerly "Orchard Shoals")
- Isle of Meadows
- Prall's Island
- Shooters Island
- Swinburne Island

Westchester County

- Pelham Islands
  - Davids Island
  - Goose Island

== Land features ==
New Jersey

- Bergen Neck
- Bergen Point
- Constable Hook
- Droyer's Point
- Kearny Point
- New Barbadoes Neck
- Paulus Hook
- Sandy Hook

New York

- Coney Island (formerly an island)
- Fort Washington Point
- Red Hook
- Rockaway Point
- Rodman's Neck
- Throgs Neck
- Ward's Point
- Willets Point

== Banks and shoals ==
Lower Bay

- East Bank
- False Hook
- Flynns Knoll
- Old Orchard Shoal
- Romer Shoal
- West Bank

Upper Bay

- Bay Ridge Flats
- Dimond Reef
- Gowanus Flats
- Jersey Flats

East River

- College Point Reef
- Hog Back
- Holmes Rock
- Lawrence Point Ledge
- Mill Rock
- Rhinelander Reef
- South Brother Ledge
- Ways Reef

== Navigational channels ==
Lower Bay

- Ambrose Channel
- Atlantic Highland Anchorage
- Chapel Hill South Channel
- Coney Island Channel
- Gravesend Bay Anchorage
- Raritan Bay East Reach
- Rockaway Inlet
- Sandy Hook Channel
- Swash Channel
- Terminal Channel

Raritan Bay

- Red Bank Reach
- Great Beds Reach
- Raritan Bay West Reach
- Raritan River Cutoff
  - Perth Amboy Anchorage
  - South Amboy Reach
- Seguine Point Bend
- Ward Point Bend (East & West)
- Ward Point Secondary Channel

Jamaica Bay

- Beach Channel
- Island Channel
- Runway Channel

Arthur Kill

- Fresh Kills Reach
- Elizabeth Port Reach
- Gulfport Reach
- Outerbridge Reach
- Port Reading Reach
- Port Socony Reach
- Pralls Island Reach
- South of Shooters Island Reach
- Tremley Point Reach

Newark Bay

- Elizabeth Channel
- Newark Bay Middle Reach
- Newark Bay North Reach
- Newark Bay South Reach
- North of Shooters Island Reach
- Port Newark Branch Channel
- Port Newark Pierhead Channel
- South Elizabeth Channel

Kill van Kull

- Bergen East Point Reach
- Bergen West Point Reach
- Constable Hook Reach

Upper Bay

- Anchorage Channel
- Bayridge Channel
- Buttermilk Channel
- Claremont Terminal Channel
- Port Jersey Channel
- Greenville Channel
- Pierhead Channel
- Red Hook Channel
- Red Hook Flats Anchorage

Hudson River

- Weehawken Edgewater Channel

East River

- East Channel
- South Brother Channel
- West Channel

== Port facilities ==
One of the many duties of the Port Authority of New York and New Jersey is to develop trade interests in the New York-New Jersey area. The Port Authority operates most of the containerized port facilities listed here, and also collaborates with the Army Corps of Engineers to maintain shipping channels in the harbor.

New Jersey (numerous privately operated bulk facilities, especially petroleum, are not listed)

- Auto Marine Terminal, Bayonne and Jersey City—Port Authority
- Port Jersey
- Port Newark–Elizabeth Marine Terminal, Newark and Elizabeth—Port Authority

New York

- Brooklyn
  - Red Hook Container Terminal—Port Authority
  - South Brooklyn Marine Terminal—City of New York
- Staten Island
  - Howland Hook Marine Terminal—Port Authority

== Lights and lighthouses ==
For lists see and. Active unless noted.

New Jersey

- Conover Beacon (Chapel Hill Front Range)
- Great Beds Light
- Old Orchard Shoal Light
- Robbins Reef Light
- Romer Shoal Light
- Sandy Hook Light
- West Bank Light (Range Front)

New York

- Ambrose Light
- Lightship Ambrose (to Scotland Station, NJ, 1933; decommissioned 1968)
- Blackwell Island Light (decommissioned 1934)
- Coney Island Light (Nortons Point)
- Execution Rocks Light
- Fort Wadsworth Light (decommissioned 1965)
- Jeffreys Hook Light
- Kings Point Light
- New Dorp Light (Swash Channel Range Rear, decommissioned 1964)
- Prince's Bay Light (decommissioned 1922)
- Staten Island Range Light
- Statue of Liberty (discontinued 1902)
- Stepping Stones Light
- Throgs Neck Light
- Whitestone Point Light

== Waterfront jurisdictions ==
=== Government and other agencies ===
- Immigration and Customs Enforcement
- National Park Service
- New Jersey Meadowlands Commission
- Port Authority of New York and New Jersey
- United States Army Corps of Engineers
- United States Coast Guard
- U.S. Customs and Border Protection
- United States Park Police
- Waterfront Commission of New York Harbor

=== State, county, municipal ===
New Jersey

- Monmouth County
  - Waterwitch Highlands
  - Atlantic Highlands
  - Leonardo
  - Belford
  - Port Monmouth
  - Keansburg
  - Port Comfort
  - Union Beach
  - Keyport
- Middlesex County
  - Laurence Harbor
  - Morgan
  - South Amboy
  - Perth Amboy
  - Sewaren
  - Port Reading
  - Chrome
  - Carteret
- Union County
  - Tremley Point
  - Grasselli
  - Linden
  - Elizabeth
    - Elizabethport
- Essex County
  - Newark
- Hudson County
  - Bayonne
    - Port Johnson
  - Liberty State Park
  - Jersey City
  - Hoboken
  - Weehawken
  - West New York
  - North Bergen
  - Edgewater

New York

- New York City
  - Manhattan, New York County
  - Brooklyn, Kings County
    - Floyd Bennett Field
    - Manhattan Beach
    - Brighton Beach
    - Coney Island
    - Gravesend
    - Bensonhurst
    - Fort Hamilton
    - Bath Beach
    - Bay Ridge
    - Red Hook
    - South Brooklyn
    - Brooklyn Heights
  - Queens, Queens County
    Lower Bay
    - Far Rockaway
    - Rockaway Point
    - Breezy Point
    East River
    - Flushing
    - Willets Point
    - La Guardia Airport
  - The Bronx, Bronx County
    - City Island
  - Staten Island, Richmond County
    - Port Richmond
    - Elm Park
    - Mariners Harbor
    - West New Brighton
    - Sailors Snug Harbor
    - New Brighton
    - Tottenville
    - Charleston
    - Port Socony
    - Travis
    - Chelsea
    - St. George
    - Tompkinsville

== See also ==
- Marine life of New York–New Jersey Harbor Estuary
- Land reclamation in Lower Manhattan
- New York Harbor Storm-Surge Barrier
- Newark Basin
