= List of smaller islands in New York City =

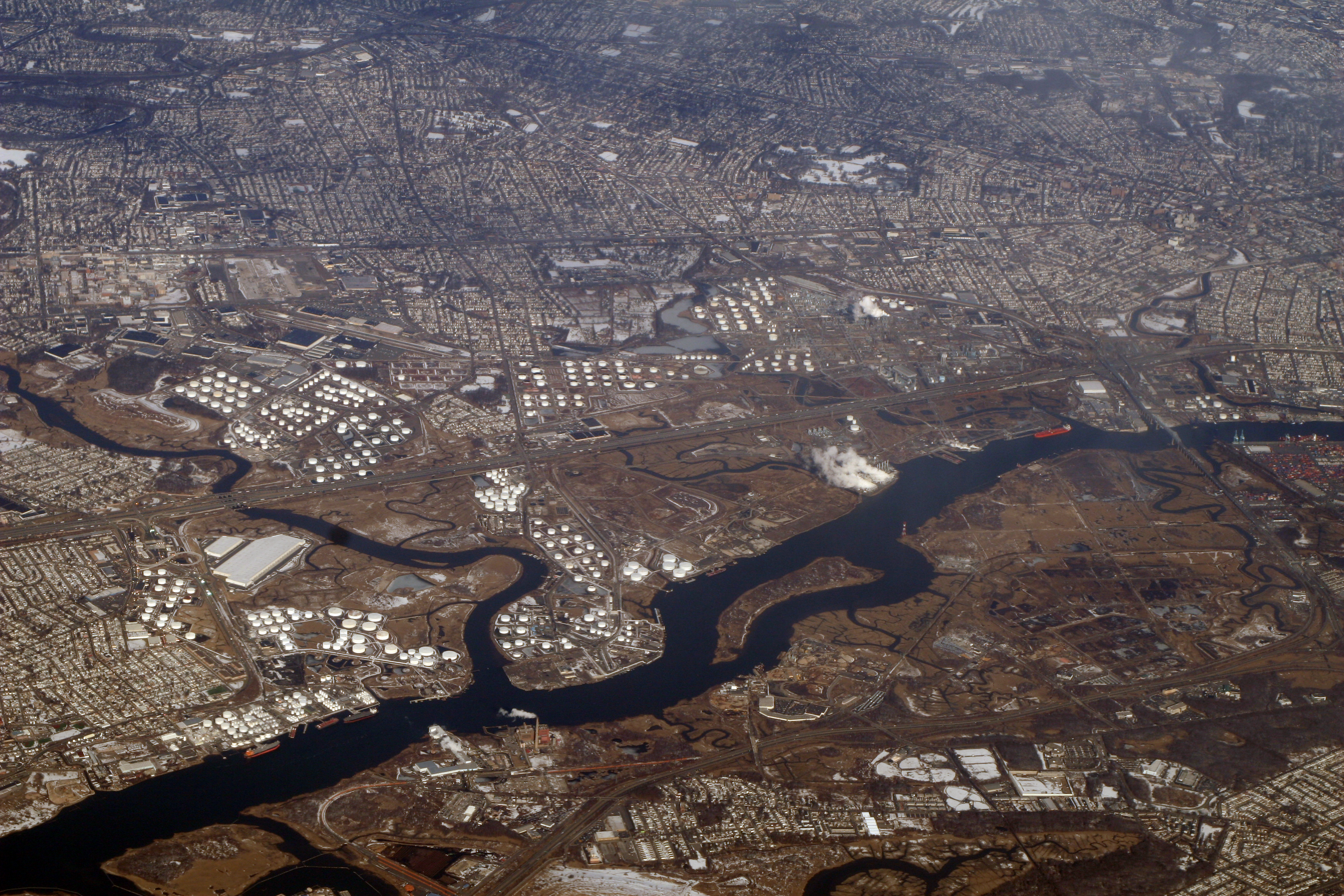
The Arthur Kill is a tidal strait that separates New Jersey (above) from Staten Island (below). Outerbridge Crossing connects the two, at the south end of Staten Island. Crossing its north end is the Goethals Bridge. The water body perpendicular to the Arthur Kill in New Jersey is the Rahway River. which divides Carteret on the south (left) and Linden on the north. The island in Arthur Kill is Prall's Island.

In addition to the three principal islands of New York City—Manhattan Island, Staten Island and part of Long Island—each borough contains several smaller islands. New York City contains about 36 to 42 islands in total.

== The Bronx ==
- Hunter Island, no longer an island, part of Pelham Bay Park
- Twin Island, no longer an island, part of Pelham Bay Park
- Goose Island, Hutchinson River, part of Pelham Bay Park
- North Brother Island (East River)
- South Brother Island (East River)
- Pelham Islands, historical name for a group of mostly uninhabited islands in western Long Island Sound
  - The Blauzes
  - Chimney Sweeps Islands
  - City Island, only inhabited island in the borough
  - Hart Island
  - High Island
  - Rat Island
- Rikers Island (East River), location of New York City's jail

== Brooklyn ==
- Canarsie Pol, uninhabited, 222-acre (90 ha) island in Jamaica Bay
- Coney Island, no longer an island
- Prospect Park Lake islands,
  - Chaim Baier Music Island
  - Duck Island
  - Three Islands
- White Island, located in Marine Park
- Ruffle Bar (Jamaica Bay)

== Manhattan ==
- Ellis Island (New York Harbor), shared with New Jersey
- Governors Island (New York Harbor)
- Liberty Island (New York Harbor)
- Mill Rock (East River)
- Randalls, Wards, and Sunken Meadow Island, joined by landfill (East River)
- Roosevelt Island (East River)
- U Thant Island, legally Belmont Island (East River)

== Queens ==
- Hog Island, destroyed
- Prince of Wales Island (Jamaica Bay)
- Rulers Bar Hassock, home to Broad Channel (Jamaica Bay)
- Ruffle Bar (Jamaica Bay)
- Subway Island / Winhole Hassock (Jamaica Bay)

== Staten Island ==
- Isle of Meadows (Arthur Kill)
- Prall's Island (Arthur Kill)
- Shooters Island (Kill van Kull), shared with New Jersey
- Hoffman Island (Lower New York Bay)
- Swinburne Island (Lower New York Bay)

== See also ==
- List of New York City lists
- List of islands of New York (state)
