= List of Bronx neighborhoods =

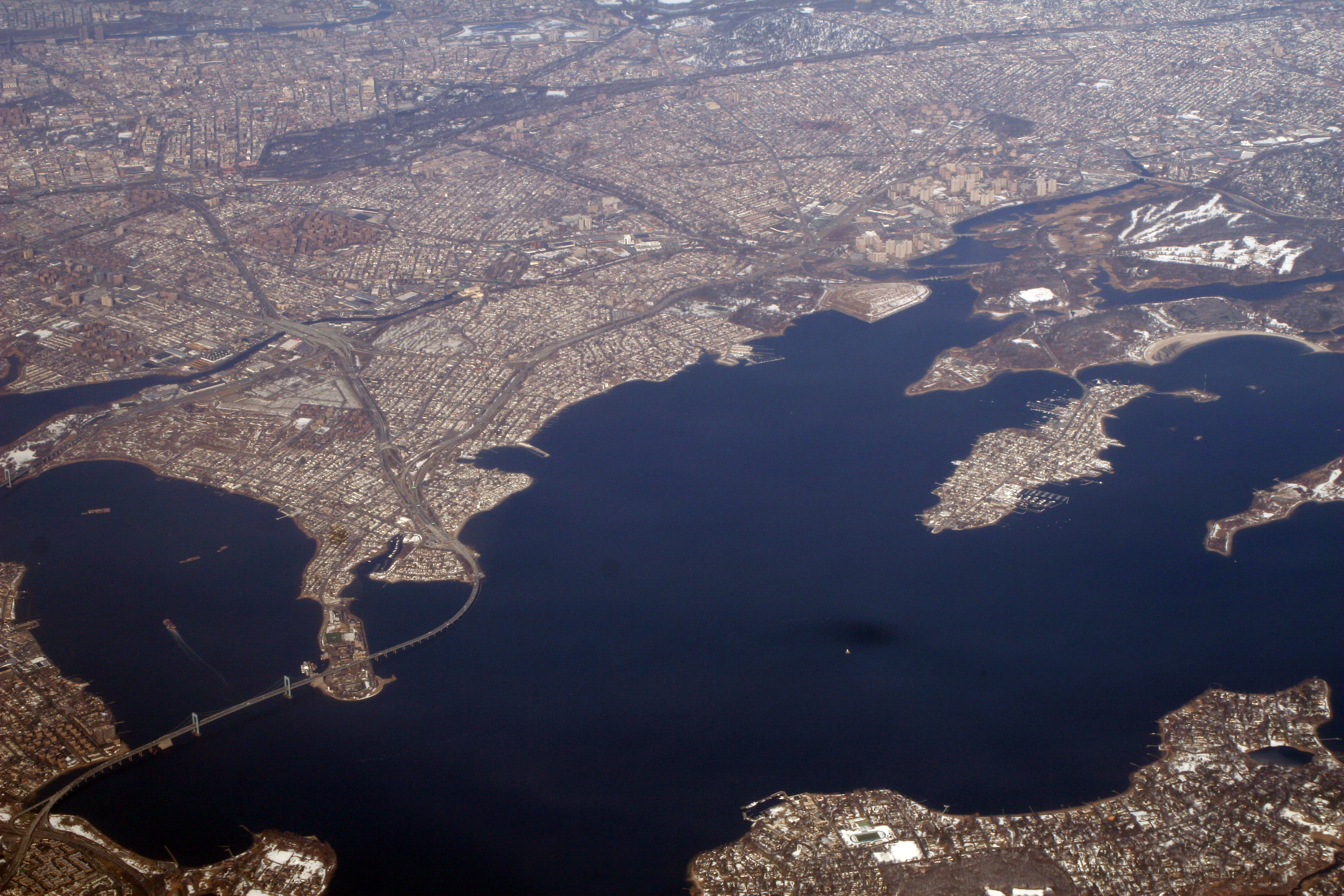
Aerial view of The Bronx

This article features a list of neighborhoods in the Bronx, one of the five boroughs of New York City.

When using this article, note that names of many (but not all) neighborhoods in the Bronx are popular based on their historical pedigree and the livability factor. However, this is not true for all neighborhoods in the Bronx; while someone living at East 213th Street & White Plains Road might prefer to describe their location simply as "Gun Hill Road" (a nearby thoroughfare) rather than "Williamsbridge". Other neighborhood names have greater popularity. For example, Riverdale was once home to John F. Kennedy and is known for its affluence, large mansions, and proximity to amenities. Throggs Neck has a bridge named for it, and the neighborhood is known for waterfront beach communities located on the Long Island Sound.

== Regions of the Bronx ==
Generally speaking, there are two major systems of dividing the Bronx into regions, which often conflict with one another. One is based on the Bronx River while the other strictly separate South Bronx from the rest of the borough. The older of the two systems is based on the Bronx River and is arguably a more accurate reflection of the area's history:

- West Bronx: all parts of the Bronx west of the Bronx River (as opposed to Jerome Avenue – this street is simply the "east-west" divider for designating numbered streets as "east" or "west." As the Bronx's numbered streets continue from Manhattan to south, on which the street numbering system is based, Jerome Avenue actually represents a longitudinal halfway point for Manhattan, not the Bronx.)
- East Bronx: all parts of the Bronx east of the Bronx River (as opposed to Jerome Avenue)

The Bronx River divides the borough nearly perfectly in half, putting the earlier-settled, more urban, and hillier sections in the western lobe and the newer, more suburbanesque coastal sections in the eastern lobe. It is an accurate reflection on the Bronx's history considering that the towns that existed in the area prior to annexation to the City of New York generally did not straddle the Bronx River. In addition, what is today the Bronx was annexed to New York City in two stages: areas west of the Bronx River were annexed in 1874 while areas to the east of the river were annexed in 1895.

Using this system, the Bronx can be further divided into the following regions:

- Northwest Bronx: the northern half of the West Bronx; the area north of Fordham road and west of the Bronx River
- Southwest Bronx: the southern half of the West Bronx; the area south of Fordham road and west of the Bronx River
- Northeast Bronx: the northern half of the East Bronx; the area north of Pelham Parkway and east of the Bronx River
- Southeast Bronx: the southern half of the East Bronx; the area south of Pelham Parkway and east of the Bronx River

A second system divides the borough first and foremost into the following sections:

- North Bronx: all areas not in the South Bronx (Southwest Bronx) – i.e. the Northwest Bronx, Northeast Bronx, and Southeast Bronx
- South Bronx: the Southwest Bronx – south of Fordham road and west of the Bronx River. This includes the areas traditionally considered part of the South Bronx.

As of 2012, listed are the Bronx neighborhoods organized and outlined:

== West Bronx ==
=== Northwest Bronx ===
- Bedford Park
- Belmont (Arthur Avenue)
- Fordham
  - Fordham Heights
  - Fordham Manor
- Jerome Park previously the grounds of the Jerome Park Racetrack
- Kingsbridge
  - Kingsbridge Heights
  - Van Cortlandt Village
- Norwood
- Riverdale
  - Central Riverdale
  - Fieldston
  - Hudson Hill
  - North Riverdale
- Spuyten Duyvil (South Riverdale)
- University Heights
- Woodlawn Heights (North of Woodlawn Cemetery)

=== Southwest Bronx ("South Bronx") ===
- Bathgate
- Claremont
- Concourse
- East Tremont
- Highbridge
- Hunts Point
- Longwood
  - Foxhurst
  - Woodstock
- Melrose
- Morris Heights
- Morrisania
  - Crotona Park East
- Mott Haven
- Port Morris
- The Hub (Melrose / Mott Haven)
- Tremont
  - Fairmount
  - Mount Hope
  - Mount Eden
- West Farms

== East Bronx ==
=== Northeast Bronx ===
- Allerton
  - Bronxwood
  - Laconia
- Baychester
- Bronxdale
- City Island
- Co-op City (Eastchester / Baychester)
- Eastchester
- Edenwald
- Pelham Gardens
- Pelham Parkway
- Wakefield
  - Washingtonville
- Williamsbridge
  - Olinville

=== Southeast Bronx ===
- Castle Hill
  - Unionport
- Clason Point
  - Harding Park
- Country Club
- Morris Park
  - Indian Village: Indian Village is very small, with only a few streets, including Seminole, Tenbroeck, Hering, Narragansett, Chocktaw, Pelham Parkway South, Pawnee, Yates, and Van Housen; Rhinelander and Neill near Seminole are also considered part of “Indian Village.” Former Senator Guy Velella owned a home off Seminole.
- Parkchester
- Park Versailles
- Pelham Bay
- Soundview
  - Bronx River (on the border of East and West)
  - Bruckner
- Schuylerville
- Throggs Neck (also spelled Throgs Neck)
  - Edgewater Park
  - Locust Point
  - Silver Beach
- Van Nest
- Westchester Heights
- Westchester Square

== Islands ==
- The Pelham Islands – The historical name for a group of uninhabited islands.
  - The Blauzes
  - Chimney Sweeps Islands
  - City Island – The only inhabited island.
  - Hart Island
  - High Island
  - Hunter Island
  - Rat Island
  - Twin Island
- North Brother Island
- South Brother Island
- Rikers Island – The location of New York City's jail.

== See also ==
- List of Brooklyn neighborhoods
- List of Manhattan neighborhoods
- List of Queens neighborhoods
- List of Staten Island neighborhoods
- Community boards of the Bronx
