= Green Flats Reef =

Reef in the Bronx, New York

Coordinates: 40.8552°N 73.7833°W

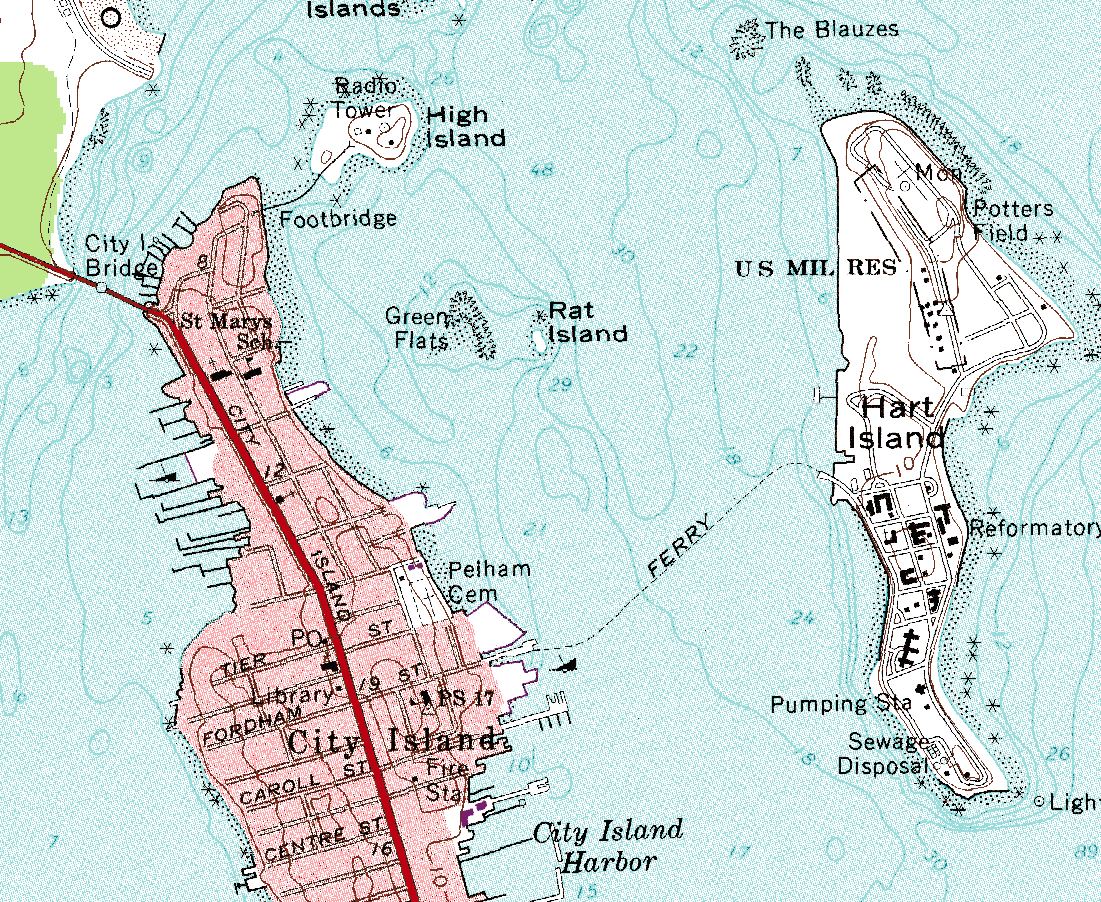
Map

Green Flats is a reef in City Island Harbor, between City Island and Rat Island. It is part of the Pelham Islands.

The reef is composed of mostly small round glacial alluvial rocks and a number of glacial erratics made of granite. It is covered in green seamoss and kelp. Like all true reefs, it is completely underwater (and a hazard to navigation) at high tide and visible at low tide.

Seagulls take mussels from the shallows and fly about 30 feet (9 m) above the reef and drop them and smash the shells on the rocks and then eat the broken up mussels there. Great blue herons may be seen there hunting at low tide.
