= City Island Harbor =

Body of water in New York City

Coordinates: 40°50′58.53″N 73°46′36.47″W

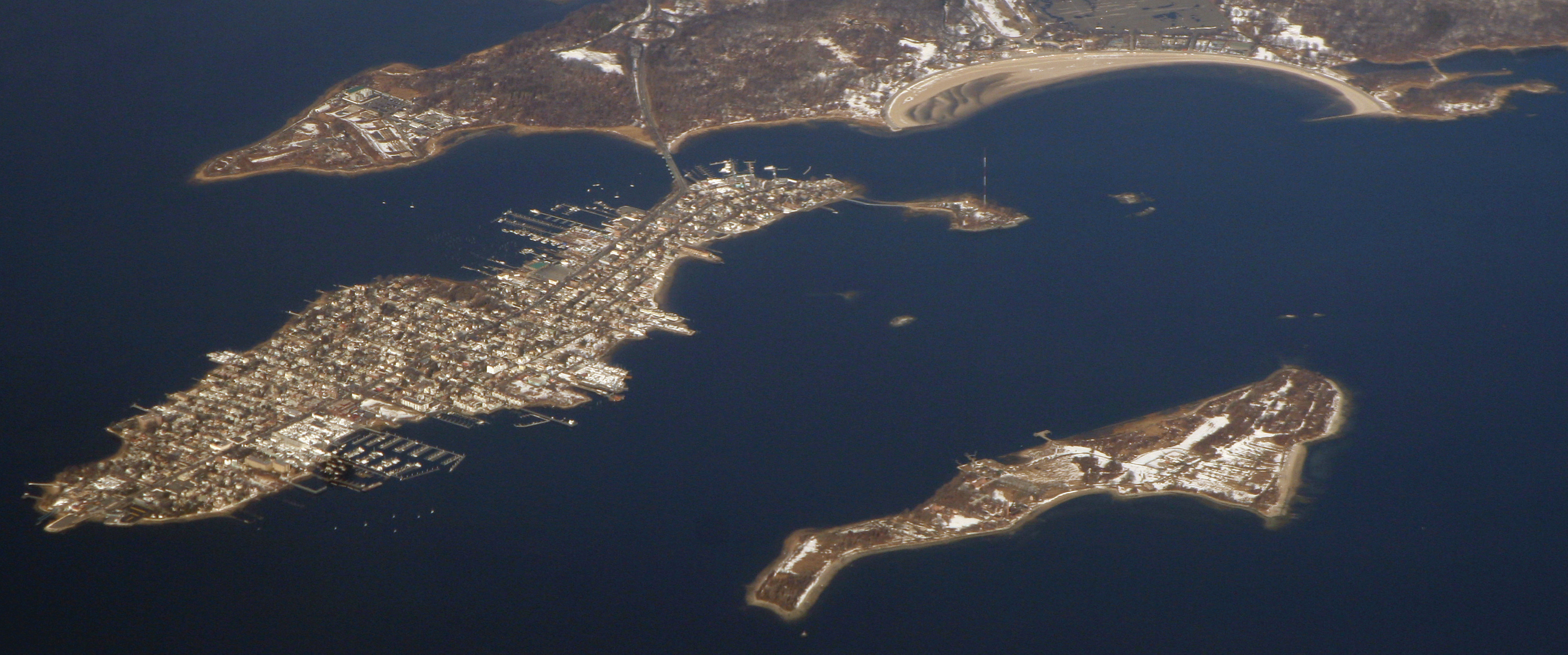
Aerial view of City Island (left) and Hart Island

City Island Harbor is the protected body of water between City Island and Hart Island in the Bronx, New York City, open to Long Island Sound at its northern and southern extremities. It is not a true harbor, but a sound. Other minor islands in and around City Island Harbor include the Chimney Sweeps Islands, the Blauzes, and Rat Island. Green Flats Reef is exposed at low tide.

Every July 4, to celebrate Independence Day, there is a large fireworks show at nearby Orchard Beach. Hundreds of boats typically gather in the harbor to view the show.

On the evening of January 24, 2003, four local boys, 15 and 16 years old, were killed when their 8-foot dinghy sank in City Island Harbor. The boys placed a short phone call to 9-1-1 but no action was taken due to insufficient information. In any case, given the frigid water temperature it is unlikely they would have survived long enough for help to arrive. Their boat was found in February and all four bodies were found in the harbor a few months later.
