= Bergen Basin =

Inlet of Jamaica Bay in Queens, New York

Coordinates: 40°39′31″N 73°49′24″W

Bergen Basin is a tributary inlet to Jamaica Bay in Queens, New York, at the northern extremity of Grassy Bay, along the western boundary of John F. Kennedy International Airport. The airport was built on the marshes of Jamaica Bay surrounding Bergen Basin in 1942. Bergen Basin was previously known as Bergen's Landing Aqueduct or Bergen Creek.

Originally Bergen Basin had been fed by a stream that emerged from the ground near 131st Street at Conduit Avenue. Bergen Basin is about 300 to 350 feet wide along its entire length and under 20 feet deep at mean low water. The Jamaica Water Pollution Control Facility discharges into Bergen Basin. The Interstate Sanitation Commission (ISC) reports that it discharges an average of 82.8 million gallons per day of secondary treated wastewater. It is classified as an estuarine subtidal open waters permanently flooded by tidal water. The entrance is marked by buoys. Conspicuous are a yellow brick circular tank about 40' high on the SW side of the entrance, and the numerous oil storage tanks at the head of the basin on the east shore. Coastal tankers and sand-and-gravel barge tows account for most of the commerce in the basin.

"In 1963, when alterations were being made to the sewage works, all the plant effluent was discharged to the basin for 2 weeks; at this time the influent sewage was septic, having been stored in the intercepting sewers for some months while the alterations were in progress, and this caused severe pollution to the basin with very strong evolution of hydrogen sulphide. In an attempt to improve conditions, bulk sodium nitrate was added to the basin to create aerobic conditions in the bottom deposits and sodium hypochlorite solution was also added to oxidize the hydrogen sulphide in the water." In 1964, a rank smell came from Bergen Basin and was smelled by residents of Howard Beach and South Ozone Park. The Department of Public Works said the smell was caused by a two-foot deposit of sediment at the bottom of the basin. The basin was dredged to remedy the situation.

In January 1988, a sunken wreck was reported in the eastern arm of the basin.
