= The Blauzes =

Small islands in the Bronx, New York

Coordinates: 40.861708°N 73.774669°W

The Blauzes are two small New York City islands in City Island Harbor which are part of a reef extending 600 yards northwest of the northern tip of Hart Island. They are composed of Manhattan schist bedrock with a slightly bluish tint and are semi-hemispherical in shape.

The Blauzes is derived from "Little Blue Ones" in Dutch. The name comes from the Belgian Huguenots, who were the first Europeans to settle the area. They are jokingly referred to by local residents as the Blue Breasts because their odd shape resembles that of a voluptuous woman's bosom.

The pair are part of the Pelham Islands.
