= Canarsie Pol =

Island in Jamaica Bay, New York City

Coordinates: 40°37′15″N 73°52′18″W

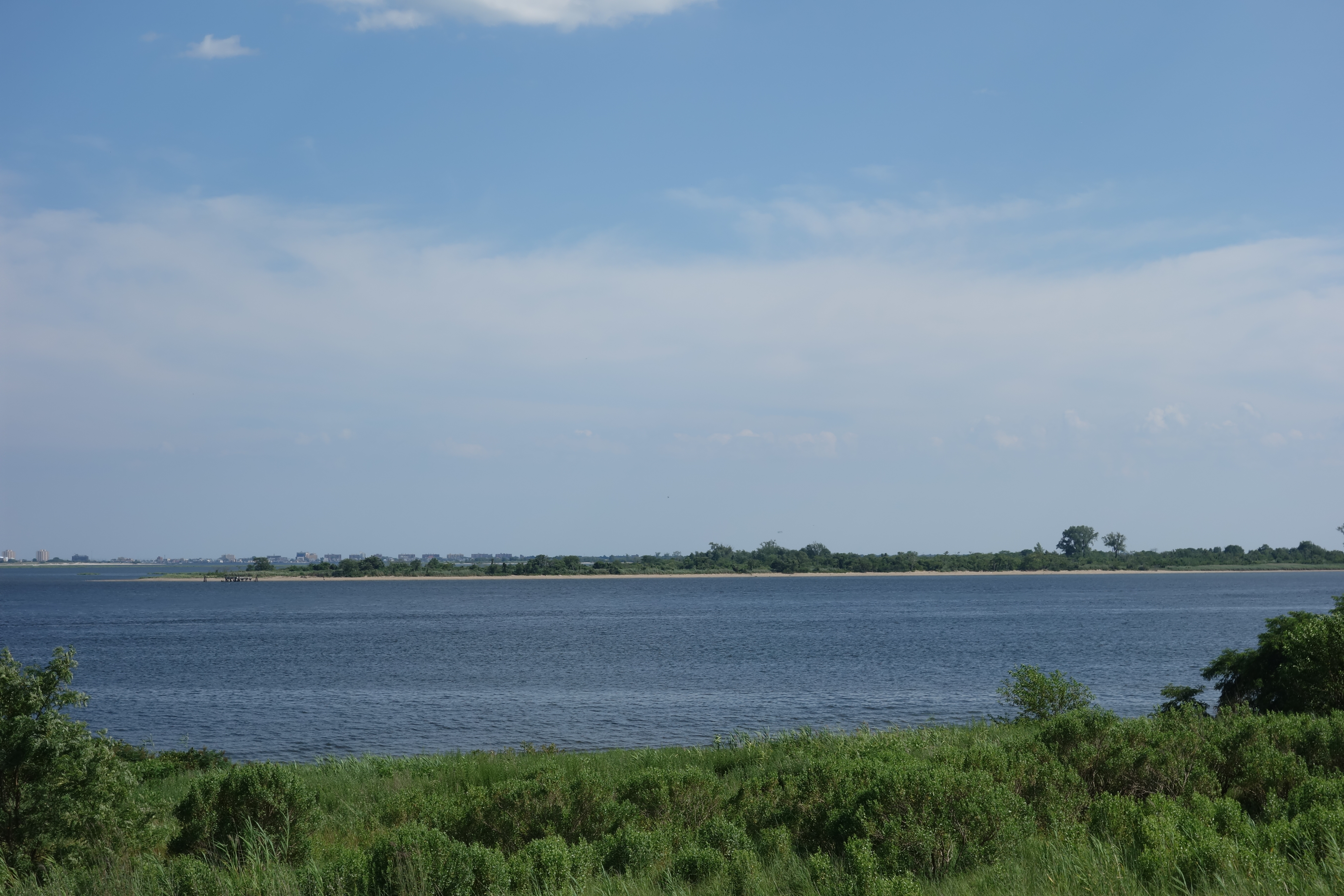
Looking south at Canarsie Pol from Shirley Chisholm State Park

Canarsie Pol is an uninhabited island south of Canarsie, Brooklyn in Jamaica Bay, New York City. It is part of Gateway National Recreation Area. Canarsie Pol is 243 acres (98 ha) large with an irregular oval shape. On 1910 maps, the island was originally much smaller; however, when nearby waterways were dredged to expand them for improved navigation, the sand and soil were piled on Canarsie Pol. Near the island are other islands and marshes in the bay. Canarsie Pol has an elevation of 10 feet (3.0 m), and is a popular destination for kayakers embarking from the Canarsie Pier.
