= Chimney Sweeps Islands =

Small islands in the Bronx, New York

Coordinates: 40.862803°N 73.783855°W

The Chimney Sweeps Islands are a pair of small islands located within New York City in the northern part of City Island Harbor in the borough of The Bronx. The islands, along with High Island, New York, divide City Island Harbor from Pelham Bay. The islands are entirely made out of bedrock. The islands are uninhabited, but are home to many birds, such as gulls, skuas, and great blue herons. The islands are owned by the New York City Department of Parks and Recreation, which acquired them in 1939 from the Chimney Sweeps Islands Corporation, a private group that used the islands for recreation, and are now a part of Pelham Bay Park.

There are two local legends about the origin of the islands' name. One is that from a distance the two islands look like Chimney Sweeps, which were brooms or tools used to clean and sweep out chimneys. The other was that a person that became rich sweeping chimneys bought the islands. A former owner of the islands, Mr. Russell Smith, suggested that the name originated in the now archaic usage of the term "chimney" to describe the flow of water between two rocks.

In the early 1900s, a family lived and operated a tavern on the islands.

Chimney Sweeps Islands

== See also ==
- The Pelham Islands
