= Rat Island (Bronx) =

Island in the Bronx, New York

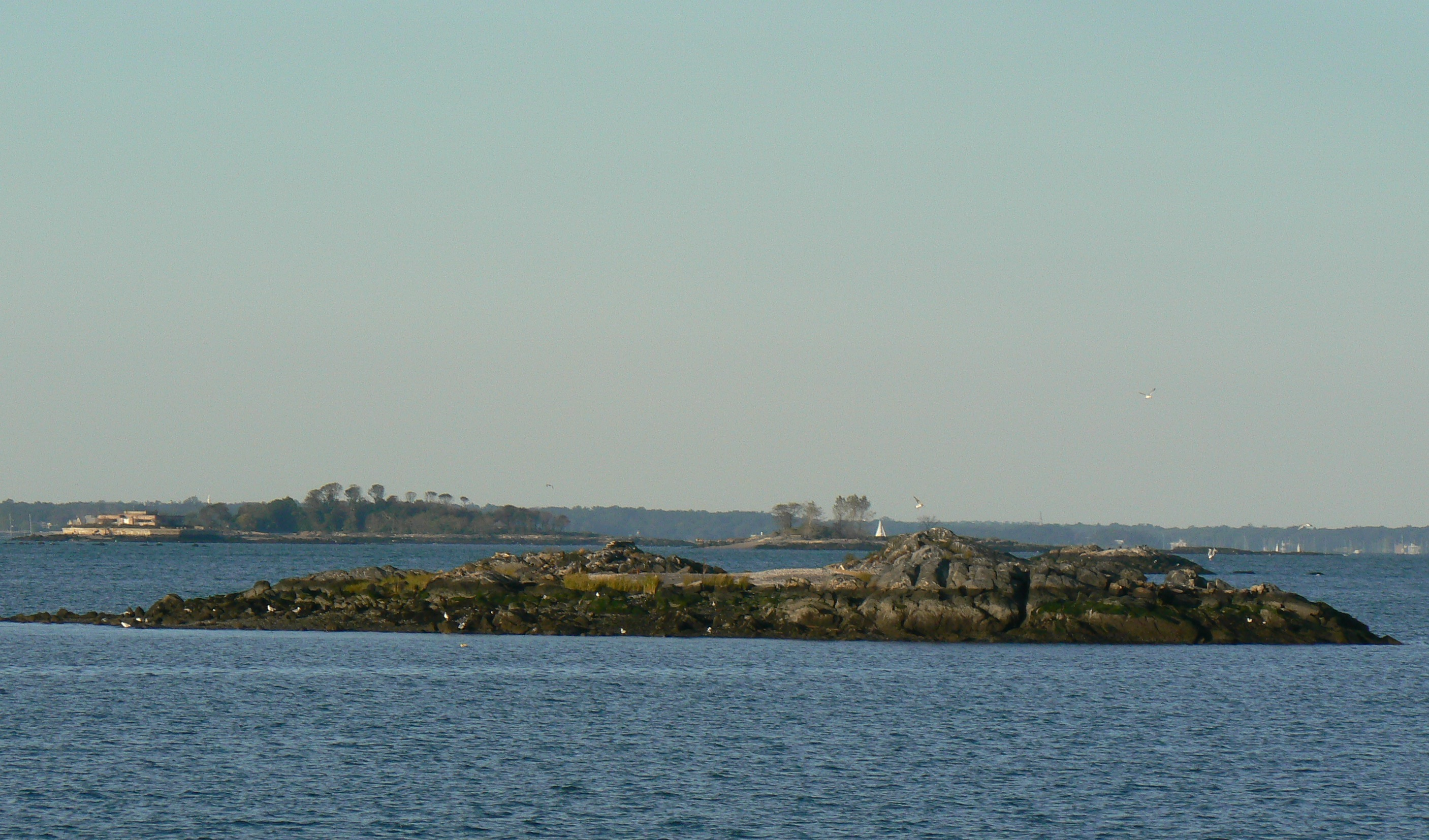
- Rat Island in 2006, as seen from City Island

- Location within New York City

Geography
- Location: Long Island Sound
- Coordinates: 40°51′18″N 73°46′51″W
- Area: 2.5 acres (1.0 ha)

Administration
- United States
- State: New York
- City: New York City
- Borough: The Bronx

Rat Island is a privately owned island in New York City. It is approximately 2.5 acres (1.0 ha) in size and located in City Island Harbor, which is a part of Long Island Sound. It is about halfway between City Island and Hart Island and south of High Island. It is one of the Pelham Islands.

== Description ==
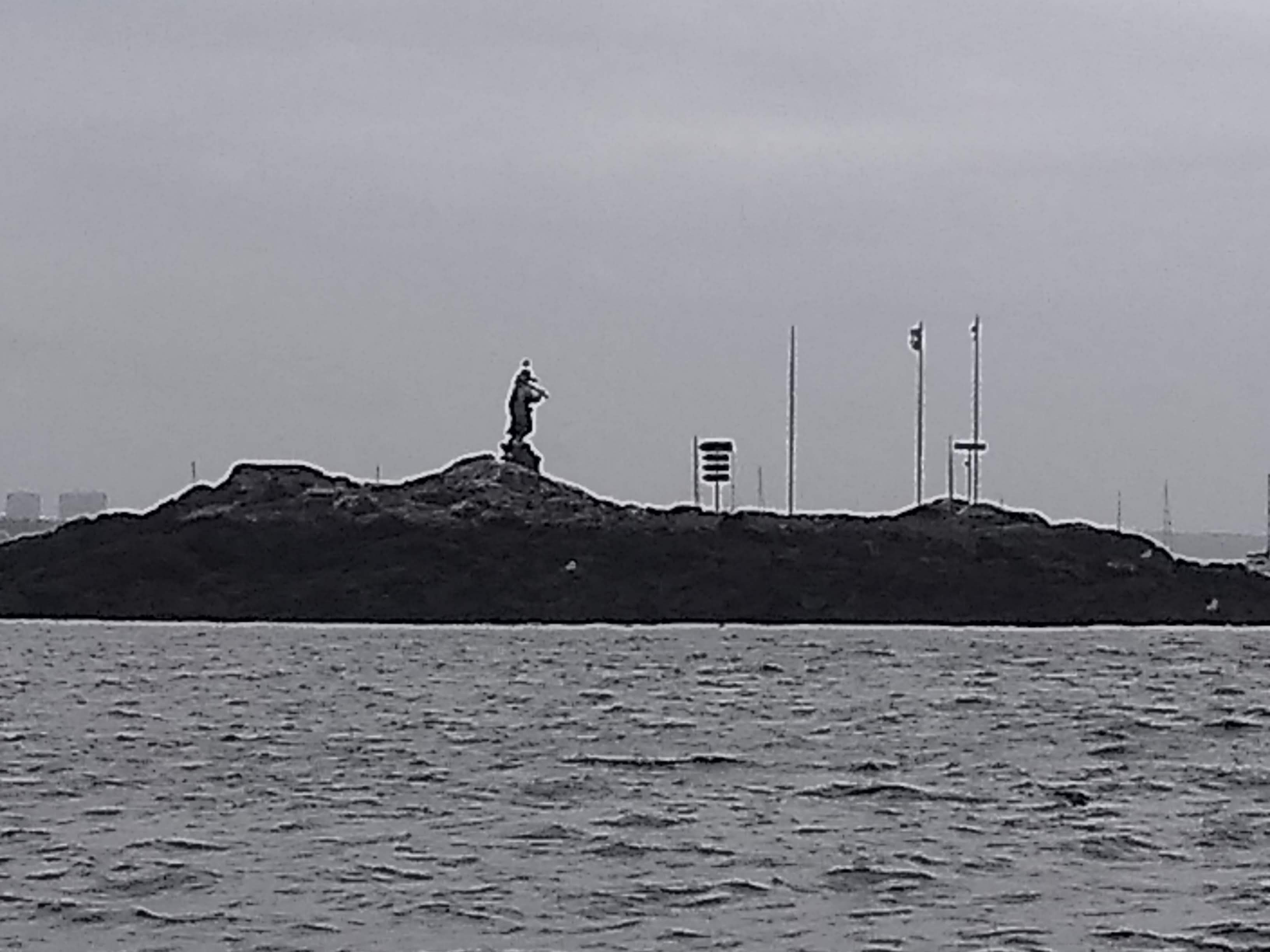
Rat Island, as seen from the north in September 2019

The small irregular island is about 2.5 acres (1.0 ha) in area. It has a dual-humped appearance and is mostly a lump of Manhattan schist bedrock. There is a small channel that cuts into the bedrock on the southern side of the tiny island that was used for launching small boats. This channel is filled with mussel shells. There is a purple-bluish "beach" made of mussel shells mixed with bird bones on the west side of the island with some reed grass.

The highest point on the island is usually covered in gull bird guano and is underwater during high tide storms. Great blue herons have been seen on the island.

== History ==
Rat Island was included in the purchase by Thomas Pell in 1654. During the typhoid fever scares of the 1800s, Rat Island was used by Pelham, New York, as a typhoid quarantine hospital for about 40 infected people called the "Pelham Pesthouse". The remains of cobblestone walls and foundations are still there. It was abandoned due to storm floods. Local legends say there was also a lighthouse for a while.

New York City purchased the island in 1888. It became a mini-colony for writers and artists in the early 20th century. It was bought by Dr. H. A. Parmentier in 1908. He subsequently leased the island to the Mount Vernon Club in 1931.

It was owned by a Brooklyn lawyer until 1972 when it was sold to Edmund "Red" Brennen. He said he bought it to do salvage work and store equipment. For many years crane buckets and lattice booms and other equipment were visible. In March 2009 Brennen put Rat Island up for sale for $300,000. On September 26, 2011, The New York Times published an article about the island, stating the property would go up for auction on October 2, 2011. It was sold at that auction for $160,000 to 71-year-old retired Port Authority worker Alex Schibli, a Swiss resident of nearby City Island. Schibli said he has no immediate plans for physical changes to the island, but is considering renaming it Malina Island after his granddaughter.

In summer months, a couple dozen people may come to the island. In the past, during summer the Parks Department used to put waste drums so they may contain their garbage. Sometimes, the local first responders use it to practice rescue missions with boats and helicopters.

In August 2016, a polyester copy of the statue of the Swiss freedom fighter William Tell was erected on the island for the 725th Swiss National Day. The original is located in Altdorf, Uri, Switzerland. In March 2017, Schibli was sued unsuccessfully in a People's Court episode for fees charged by an engineer whom he asked to give an estimate on what was needed to put a more permanent statue of William Tell on the island.

== Name ==
It is not known how the island received its name. It has been proposed by Red Brennan and others including former prison workers that prisoners escaping from Hart Island nearby, nicknamed "rats", used the small island to rest before swimming on to City Island and freedom. Another theory is that when the island housed typhoid victims in the 19th century it presumably attracted vermin.

According to Schibli, the island's original name was "Rattle Island," because rattling noisemakers were used to ward off ships.
