= Pelham Islands =

Archipelago in New York

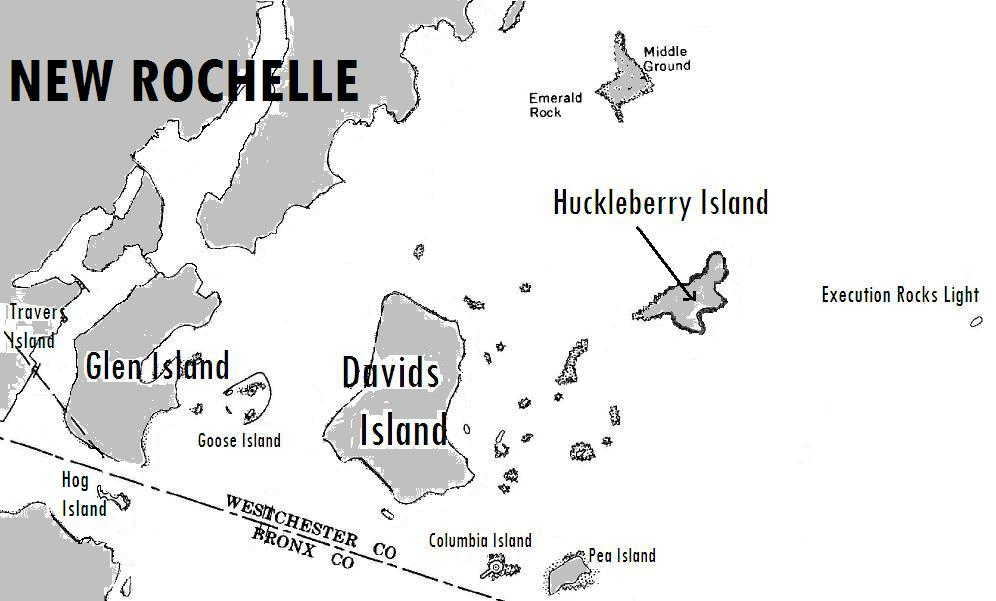

- Location within New York City

Geography
- Location: Long Island Sound
- Coordinates: 40.883417°N 73.770231°W
- Total islands: 10
- Major islands: 3

Administration
- United States
- State: New York

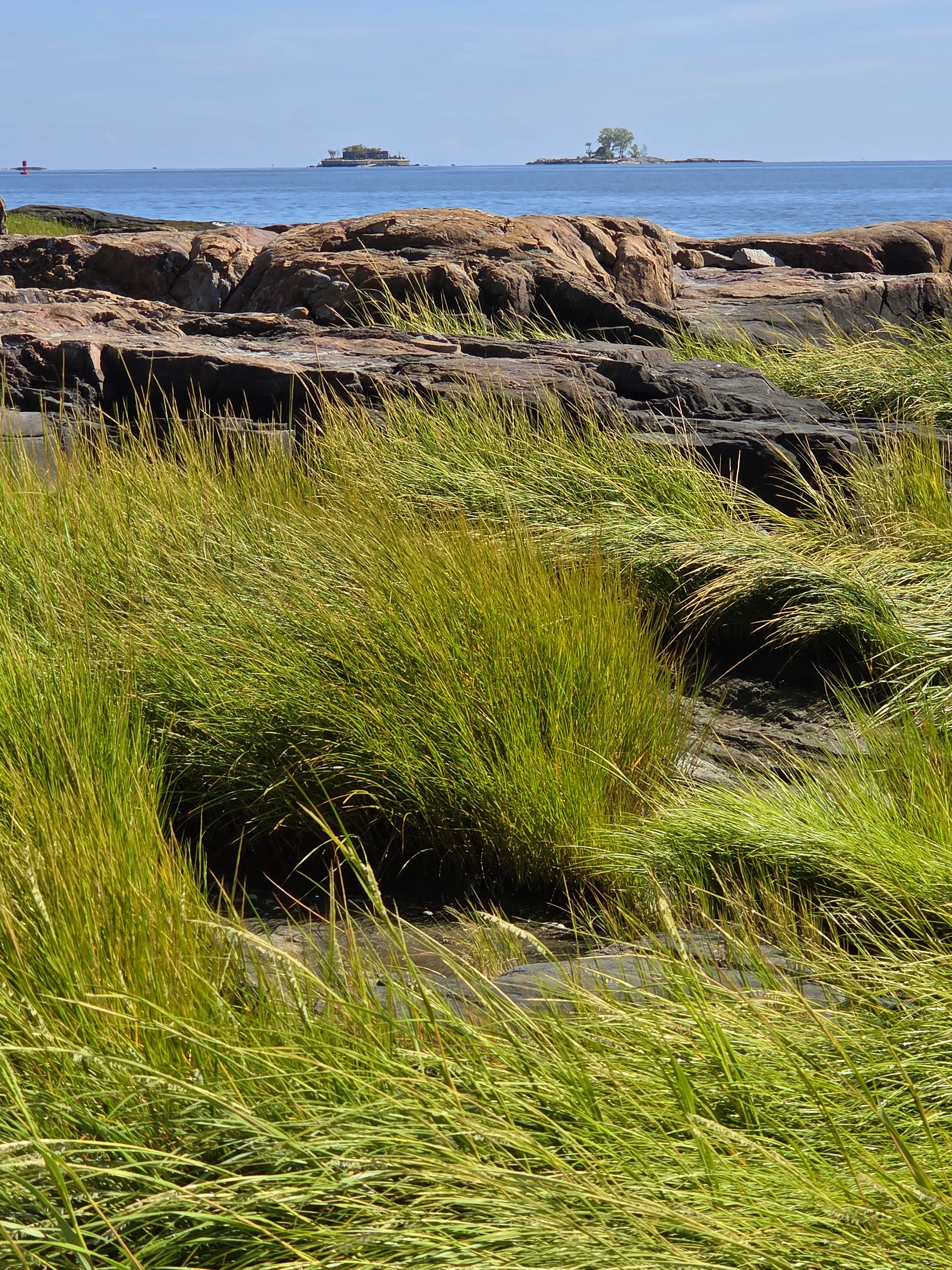
View of Pelham Islands from Pelham Bay Park

The Pelham Islands are a group of islands in western Long Island Sound that belonged to Thomas Pell in the 17th century. The islands, and most of the surrounding area, were purchased from the Siwanoy Indians by Pell in 1654, creating Pelham Manor. This large tract of land would eventually become the present-day Town and Village of Pelham and Pelham Manor, Town of Eastchester, cities of New Rochelle and Mount Vernon in Westchester County, and the Pelham Bay and Eastchester neighborhoods of the Bronx in New York City.

Several of the Pelham Islands became part of New Rochelle after Jacob Leisler’s purchase of 6,000 acres (2,400 hectares) from the Pell family in 1688. The remaining islands became part of Bronx County in 1895 with the establishment of the current Westchester-Bronx County line.

== Islands ==
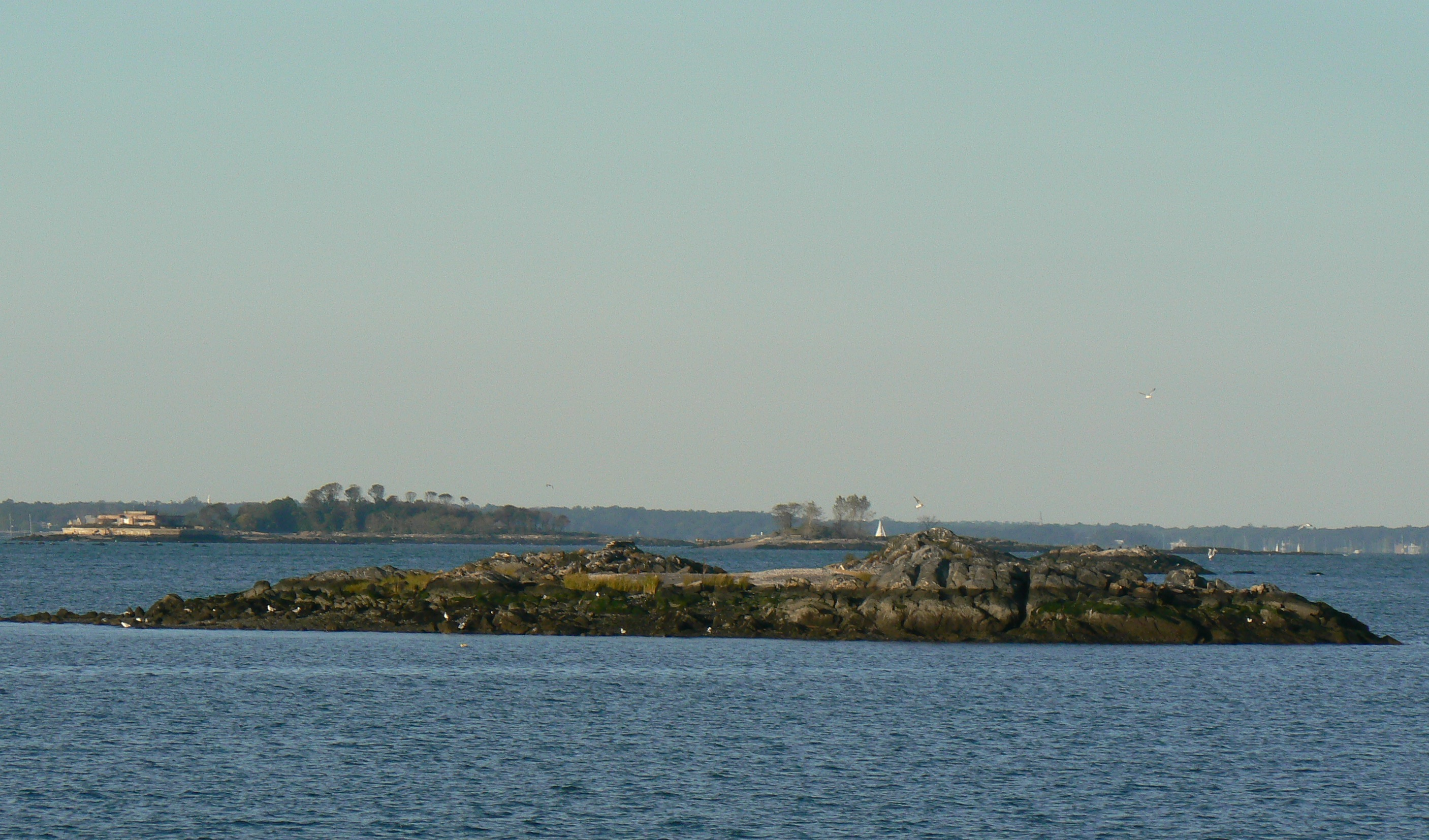
Rat Island

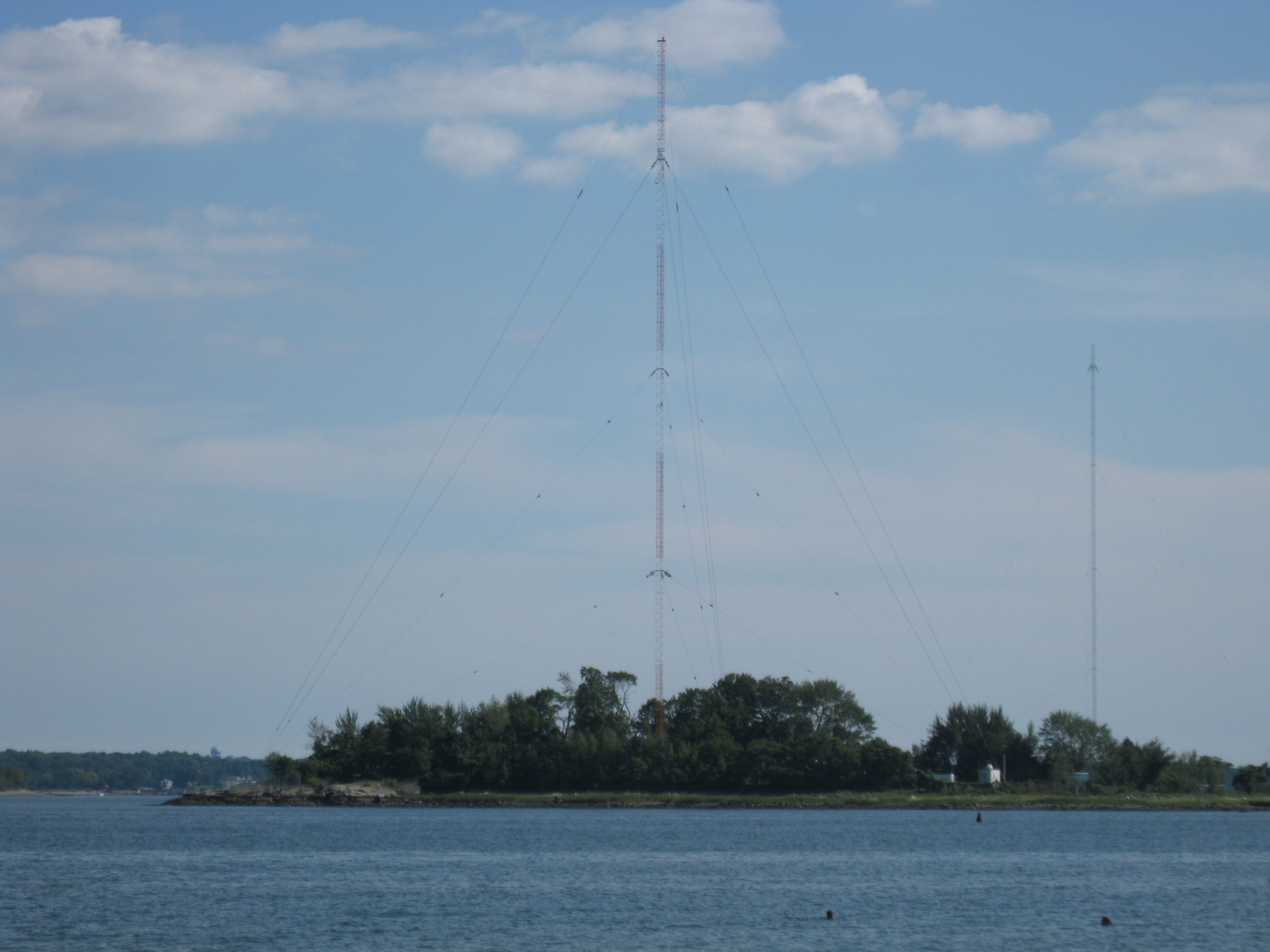
High Island

- The Blauzes - a pair of small islands in City Island Harbor made of Manhattan schist bedrock.
- Chimney Sweeps Islands - a pair of small, uninhabited islands made entirely of bedrock. The islands were acquired by the government of New York City on April 29, 1939, and are now part of Pelham Bay Park.
- City Island - originally known as “Great Minnefords”, the 235 acre island is the largest of the group. Before the Revolutionary War, Benjamin Palmer renamed it "City Island" as part of his plans to create a great port city. The onset of the Revolutionary War brought an end to those plans. It remained part of the Town of Pelham until June 6, 1895, when the present boundary line between Westchester and Bronx Counties was established, placing City Island within Bronx County, City of New York.
- Davids Island - a 78-acre island in New Rochelle. The island has been used as farmland by the early Huguenot settlers, a military hospital for injured Civil War soldiers, a U.S. Army Fort (Fort Slocum), and a U.S. Army Air Defense Command "Nike" missile site during the Cold War.
- Goose Island - a series of rocky outcroppings located in New Rochelle
- Hart Island - originally known as “Little Minnefords”, the 101 acre island lies off the eastern shore of City Island, The federal government took possession of the island during the Civil War for use as a training facility. The City of New York purchased Hart Island in 1868, and it has been used as a quarantine site for infected individuals during the Yellow Fever Epidemic, a reformatory for vicious boys, a home for German prisoners of war during World War II, a "Nike" missile installation used by the U.S. Army Air Defense Command during the Cold War, and a facility for the rehabilitation of drug addicts. It is now the city's primary potter's field.
- High Island - an 8-acre island was purchased in 1762 by Captain John Wooley, which he then named "High Island" for its elevated center. A radio broadcasting company bought the island in 1962 and built an automobile bridge to City Island. WCBS and WFAN currently operate the 529-foot antenna tower on the island.
- Hunter Island - the 19th century country estate of the wealthy New York City merchant John Hunter. When the New York City government developed Pelham Bay Park in 1937, the stretch of water between Hunter's Island and the land opposite City Island Bridge was filled, converting the island into a peninsula.
- Rat Island - a 2.5 acre island which has been used as a typhoid quarantine hospital, an artists' and writers' colony, and a fisherman’s campsite.
- Travers Island - a former island connected by landfill to mainland New Rochelle, and is the summer home of the New York Athletic Club.
- Twin Island - a former island which was connected to Rodman's Neck by landfill in the 1930s. They are now part of Orchard Beach in Pelham Bay Park.

== See also ==
- Green Flats Reef
- Execution Rocks Lighthouse
- Eastchester Bay
- Cuban Ledge
