= High Island (Bronx) =

Small island in the Bronx, New York

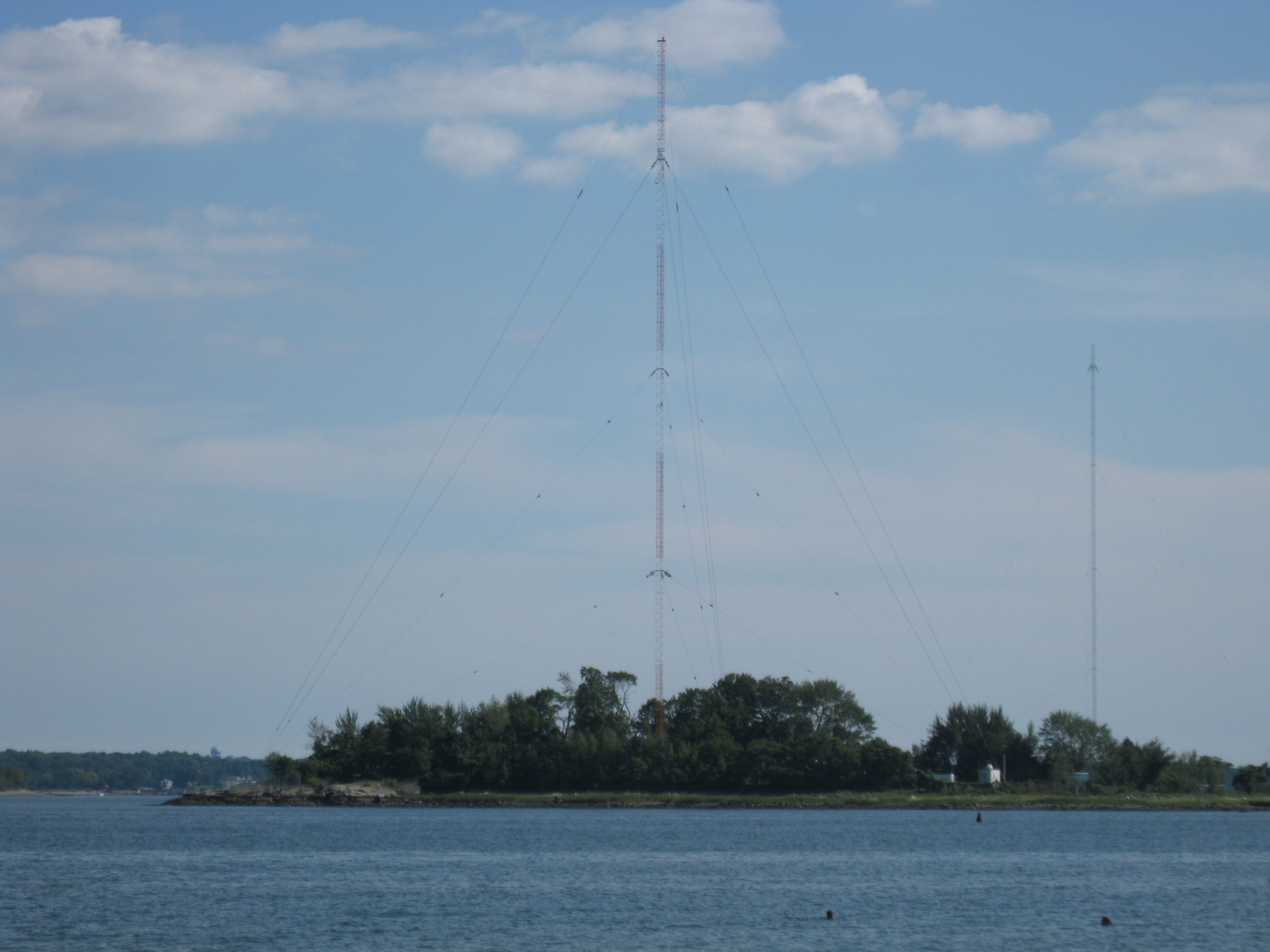
- High Island as viewed from nearby Orchard Beach.

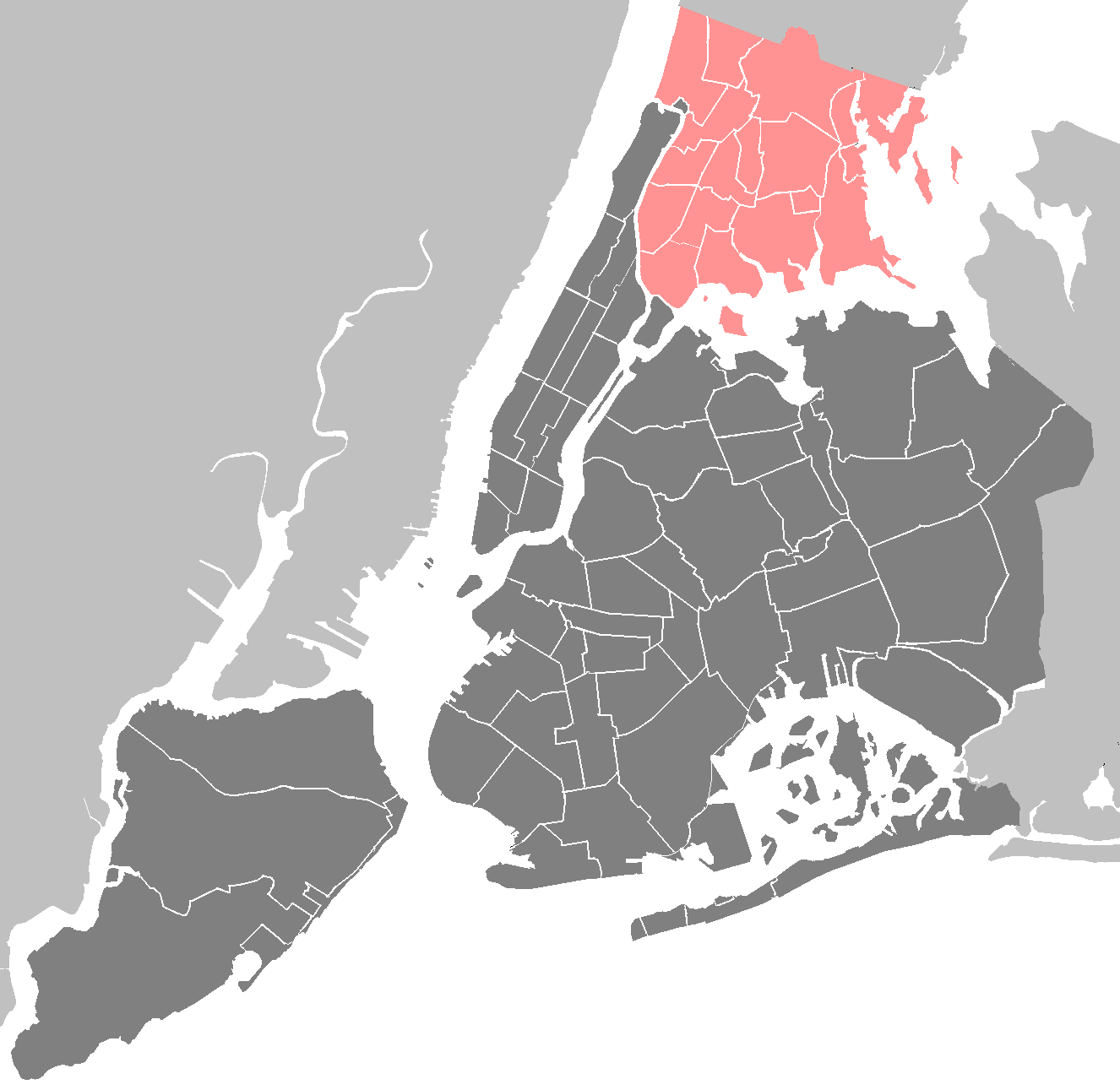
- Location within Bronx

Geography
- Location: Long Island Sound
- Coordinates: 40.859571°N 73.786159°W
- Archipelago: The Pelham Islands
- Area: 0.02 sq mi (0.052 km^{2})
- Length: 0.7 mi (1.1 km)
- Width: 0.8 mi (1.3 km)

Administration
- United States
- State: New York
- City: New York City
- Borough: The Bronx

Demographics
- Population: 0 (2017)

High Island is a small, uninhabited, privately-owned island, part of the Pelham Islands in the Bronx, New York City. It lies east of the north end of City Island between City Island Harbor and Pelham Bay in Long Island Sound. It is connected to City Island by a sandbar that emerges at very low tide, as well as by a small private bridge.

Previously used as a stone quarry and then a summer resort, the island today is used to support two radio station transmitters and antennas.

== History ==
High Island was once known as Shark Island due to the many sand sharks which used to swim in the nearby waters of Pelham Bay. The island is comparatively high with a shape similar to a gumdrop, thus alluding to the origin of its present-day name.

Elisha King purchased the island in 1829 to quarry stones. During the 1920s, the Miller family operated a community of summer rental cottages catering to about 40 families.

In October 1960, the National Broadcasting Company purchased the island and acquired its deed, with plans to construct a radio transmission tower. CBS later purchased half of NBC's interest, creating a joint venture. After over two years of construction, the new tower and supporting structures housing the transmitters for WNBC (660 AM) and WCBS (880 AM) went into operation in 1963. Prior to High Island, the WCBS facility was located on nearby Columbia Island in New Rochelle, New York, and the WNBC transmitter was based in Sands Point, New York.

On August 27, 1967, a small private airplane crashed into the radio tower, destroying the antenna and taking WCBS and WNBC off the air, the day before WCBS's all news format launched. Both stations were able to borrow nearby transmission facilities for about a week, until an emergency tower could be erected on High Island. The permanent replacement was built with a second (shorter) tower as an emergency backup.

The deed to High Island remained with NBC until 1988, when it was transferred to Emmis Communications as part of the latter company's purchase of WNBC. Emmis owned WFAN, an existing station which moved to WNBC's frequency in October 1988. WFAN was sold by Emmis in 1992 to Infinity Broadcasting, while CBS and WCBS were acquired by Westinghouse Electric Corporation in 1995. WCBS and WFAN became sister stations in 1997 when Infinity was purchased by Westinghouse.

In August 2024, WCBS changed its call letters to WHSQ after Good Karma Brands took over operational control of 880 AM, replacing WCBS's news format with ESPN Radio sports programming.

== Current use ==
As of 2026, the entire island and the two radio transmission towers are owned by Audacy, Inc., which through several acquisitions and mergers has owned both radio stations since 2017.

The taller of the towers is 548 feet (167 m). The shorter tower is 300 feet (91 m) and was built in 2001 to replace the emergency tower erected in 1967. The proximity of these two AM radio stations has, at times, caused interference on telephones and electronic equipment on nearby City Island. High Island is only an AM radio transmission facility. It does not have any studios or tower tenants, other than the two AM radio stations.

WFAN and WHSQ broadcast from studios located separately in the Tribeca section of Manhattan. Good Karma Brands operates ESPN Radio under license from the Walt Disney Company, the corporate parent of ESPN.

A full-time caretaker's residence was in use from 1961 to 2007. The island is currently uninhabited and maintained by the radio stations' engineers and contractors. Advances in broadcast and security technology have made remote monitoring of both the radio equipment and the physical property more feasible than in earlier years where a full-time human presence was required.
