= Hart Island =

Island in the Bronx, New York

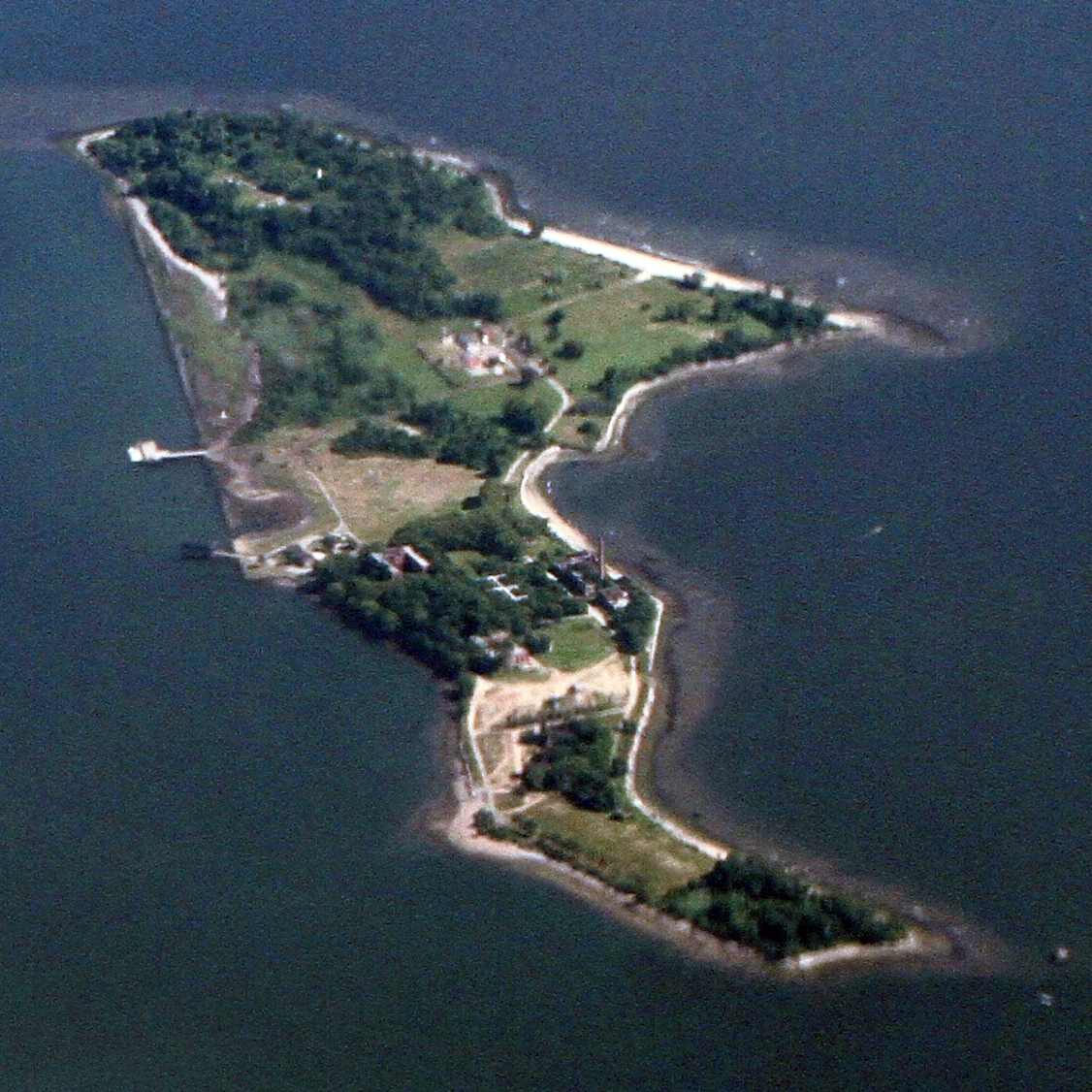
- Aerial view of Hart Island, in 2012
- Location in New York City

Geography
- Location: Long Island Sound
- Coordinates: 40°51′9″N 73°46′12″W
- Archipelago: Pelham Islands
- Area: 131.22 acres (53.10 ha)
- Length: 1.0 mi (1.6 km)
- Width: 0.33 mi (0.53 km)
- State: New York
- City: New York City
- Borough: The Bronx

Additional information
- Time zone: Eastern (UTC– 05:00)
  - Summer (DST): EDT (UTC– 04:00)

Hart Island, sometimes referred to as Hart's Island, (Note: See, for instance:) is located at the western end of Long Island Sound, in the northeastern Bronx in New York City. Measuring approximately 1 mile (1.6 km) long by 0.33 miles (0.53 km) wide, Hart Island is part of the Pelham Islands archipelago and is east of City Island.

The island's first public use was as a training ground for the United States Colored Troops in 1864. Since then, Hart Island has been the location of a Union Civil War prison camp, a psychiatric institution, a tuberculosis sanatorium, a potter's field used for both individual and mass burials, a homeless shelter, a boys' reformatory and workhouse, a jail, and a drug rehabilitation center. Several other structures, such as an amusement park, were planned for Hart Island but not built. During the Cold War, Nike defense missiles were stationed on Hart Island. The island was intermittently used as a prison and a homeless shelter until 1967; the last inhabited structures were abandoned in 1977. The potter's field on Hart Island was run by the New York City Department of Correction until 2019, when the New York City Council voted to transfer jurisdiction to the New York City Department of Parks and Recreation.

The remains of more than one million people are buried on Hart Island. Since the first decade of the 21st century, however, there have been fewer than 1,500 burials a year. Burials on Hart Island include individuals who were not claimed by their families or did not have private funerals; the homeless and the indigent; and mass burials of disease victims. Access to the island was restricted by the Department of Correction, which operated an infrequent ferryboat service and imposed strict visitation quotas. Burials were conducted by inmates from the nearby Rikers Island jail until 2020 and the COVID-19 pandemic. The Hart Island Project, a public charity founded by visual artist Melinda Hunt, worked to improve access to the island and make burial records more easily available. Transfer to the Parks Department in 2019 had been sought for over twenty years and was hoped to ease public access to the Island. Burials in the island's potter's field continued after the transfer.

== Toponymy ==
There are numerous theories about the origins of the island's place name. One theory posits that British cartographers named it "Heart Island" in 1775 due to its organ-like shape but the 'e' was dropped shortly after. A map drawn in 1777 and subsequent maps refer to the island as "Hart Island". Other names given to the island during the late 18th century were "Little Minneford Island" and "Spectacle Island", the latter because the island's shape was thought to resemble spectacles.

Another theory, based on the meaning of the English word "hart", which means "stag", is that the island was named when it was used as a game reserve. Another version holds that it was named in reference to deer that migrated from the mainland during periods when ice covered that part of Long Island Sound.

== Geography ==
Hart Island is approximately 1 mile (1.6 km) long by 0.33 miles (0.53 km) wide at its widest point. It lies about 0.33 miles (0.53 km) off the eastern shore of City Island. The island's area is disputed; according to some sources, it is 101 acres (41 ha), while others state that it is 131 acres (53 ha). Hart Island is isolated from the rest of the city: there is no electricity and the only means of access is via ferryboat.

== History ==
1884 Nautical Chart

=== Early history ===
Before European colonization, Hart Island was occupied by the Siwanoy tribe of Native Americans, who were indigenous to the area. In 1654, English physician Thomas Pell purchased the island from the Siwanoy as part of a 9,166-acre (37.09 km^{2}) property. Pell died in 1669 and ownership passed to his nephew Sir John Pell, the son of British mathematician John Pell. The island remained in the Pell family until 1774, when it was sold to Oliver De Lancey. It was later sold to the Rodman, Haight, and Hunter families, in that order. According to Elliott Gorn, Hart Island had become "a favorite pugilistic hideaway" by the early 19th century. Bouts of bare-knuckle boxing held on the island could draw thousands of spectators.

The first public use of Hart Island was training the 31st Infantry Regiment of the United States Colored Troops beginning in 1864. A steamboat called John Romer shuttled recruits to the island from the Battery at the southern tip of Manhattan. A commander's house and a recruits' barracks were built; the barracks included a library and a concert room; it could house 2,000 to 3,000 recruits at a time, and over 50,000 men were ultimately trained there.

In November 1864, construction of a prisoner-of-war camp on Hart Island with room for 5,000 prisoners started. The camp was used for four months in 1865 during the American Civil War. The island housed 3,413 captured Confederate Army soldiers. Of these, 235 died in the camp and were buried in Cypress Hills Cemetery. Following the Civil War, indigent veterans were buried on the island in soldier's plots, which were separate from the potter's field and at the same location. Some of these soldiers were moved to West Farms Soldiers Cemetery in 1916 and others were removed to Cypress Hills Cemetery in 1941.

=== Addition of a cemetery ===
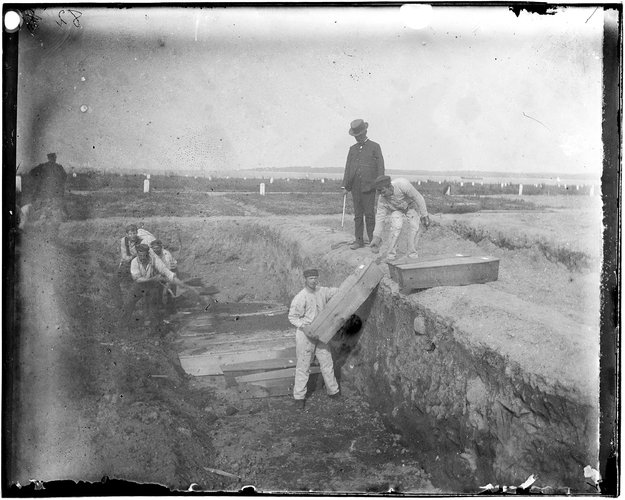
A trench at the potter's field on Hart Island, circa 1890 by Jacob Riis

The first burials on Hart Island were those of 20 Union Army soldiers during the American Civil War. On May 27, 1868, New York City purchased the island for $75,000 from Edward Hunter, who also owned the nearby Hunter Island. City burials started shortly afterward. In 1869, a 24-year-old woman named Louisa Van Slyke, who died in Charity Hospital, was the first person to be buried in the island's 45-acre (180,000 m^{2}) public graveyard. The cemetery then became known as "City Cemetery" and "Potter's Field".

By 1880, The New York Times described the island as "the Green-Wood of Five Points", comparing an expansive cemetery in Brooklyn with a historically poor neighborhood in Manhattan. The newspaper also said of Hart Island, "This is where the rough pine boxes go that come from Blackwell's Island", in reference to the influx of corpses being transported from the hospitals on modern-day Roosevelt Island. The potter's field on Hart Island replaced two previous potter's fields on the current sites of Washington Square Park and New York Public Library Main Branch in Manhattan. The number of burials on Hart Island exceeded 500,000 by 1958.

=== Juxtaposition of uses ===
Hart Island was used as a quarantine station during the 1870 yellow fever epidemic. In that period, the island contained a women's psychiatric hospital called The Pavilion, which was built 1885, as well as a tubercularium. There was also an industrial school with 300 students on the island. After an 1892 investigation found the city's asylums were overcrowded, it was proposed to expand those on Hart Island from 1,100 to 1,500 beds.

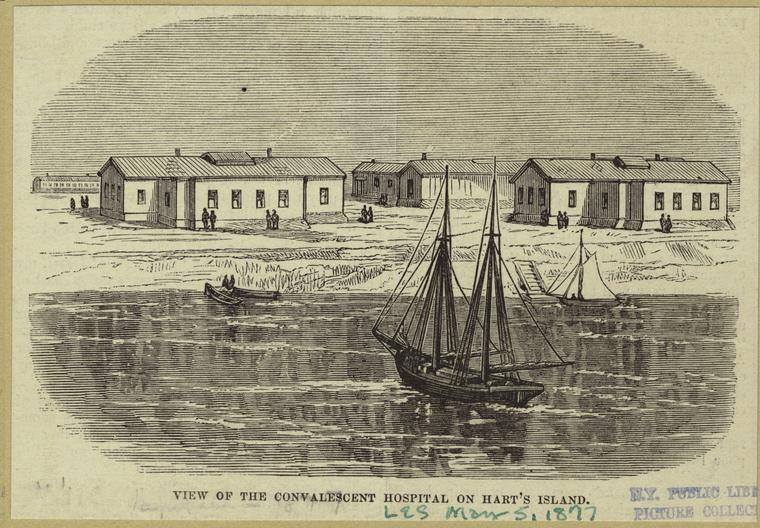
Convalescent Hospital on Hart Island, 1877

In the late 19th century, Hart Island became the location of a boys' workhouse, which was an extension of the prison and almshouse on Blackwell Island. A workhouse for men was established in 1895, and was followed by a workhouse for young boys ten years later. By the early 20th century, Hart Island housed about 2,000 delinquent boys as well as elderly male prisoners from Blackwell's penitentiary. The prison on Hart Island grew; it had its own band and a Catholic prison chapel. The cornerstone for the $60,000 chapel was laid in 1931 and it was opened the following year.

In 1924, John Hunter sold his 4-acre (1.6 ha) tract of land on Hart Island's west side to Solomon Riley, a millionaire real estate speculator from Barbados. Riley subsequently proposed to build an amusement park on Hart Island, which would have served the primarily black community of Harlem in Manhattan. It was referred to as the "Negro Coney Island" because at the time, African Americans were banned from the Rye Playland and Dobbs Ferry amusement parks in the New York City area. Riley had started building a dance hall, boardinghouses, and a boardwalk, and purchased sixty steamboats for the operation. The state government raised concerns about the proposed park's proximity to a jail and hospital, and the city condemned the land in 1925. Riley was later paid $144,000 for the seizure.

=== After World War II ===
The prison population of Hart Island was moved to Rikers Island during World War II, and Hart Island's former workhouse was used as a disciplinary barracks by the United States Armed Forces. Rikers Island soon became overcrowded with prisoners. The New York City Department of Correction reopened Hart Island as a prison following the war, but the facilities were considered inadequate. The New York City Board of Estimate approved the construction of a homeless shelter on the island in 1950; it was intended to serve 2,000 people. The homeless shelter operated from 1951 to 1954; it was also used to house alcoholics. Residents of nearby City Island opposed the inclusion of the homeless shelter. The New York City Welfare Department closed the homeless shelter and the Department of Correction regained control of the island. The Department of Correction opened an alcoholism treatment center on Hart Island in 1955. A courthouse, which ruled on cases involving the homeless, was opened on Hart Island. The island housed between 1,200 and 1,800 prisoners serving short sentences of between 10 days and two years.

In 1956, the island was retrofitted with Nike Ajax missile silos. Battery NY-15, as the silos were known, were part of the United States Army base Fort Slocum from 1956 to 1961 and were operated by the army's 66th Antiaircraft Artillery Missile Battalion. The silos were underground and were powered by large generators. Some silos were also built on Davids Island. The integrated fire control system that tracked the targets and directed missiles was at Fort Slocum. The last components of the missile system were closed in 1974.

Construction of a new $7 million workhouse on Hart Island to replace the existing facility was announced in 1959. A baseball field was dedicated at the Hart Island prison the following year. It was named Kratter Field, after Marvin Kratter, a businessman who had donated 2,200 seats saved from the demolished Ebbets Field stadium. The seats deteriorated after being outdoors for several years, and by 2000, had been donated to various people and organizations.

The island continued to be used as a prison until 1966, when the prison was closed due to changes in the penal code. After it closed, a drug rehabilitation center was proposed for Hart Island. The center became Phoenix House, which opened in 1967; it quickly grew into a settlement with 350 residents and a vegetable garden. Phoenix House hosted festivals that sometimes attracted crowds of more than 10,000 people. Phoenix House published a newsletter known as The Hart Beat and organized baseball games against other organizations such as City Island's and NBC's teams. In 1977, after regular ferry service to Hart Island ended, Phoenix House moved from the island to a building in Manhattan.

Since then, proposals to re-inhabit the island have failed. In 1972, the city considered converting it into a residential resort but the plan was abandoned. New York City mayor Ed Koch created a workhouse on the island for persons charged with misdemeanors in 1982 but not enough prisoners were sent there. Six years later, another proposal called for a homeless shelter and a workhouse to be built on Hart Island, but this plan was abandoned because of opposition from residents of City Island.

=== Use as cemetery, abandonment of structures ===
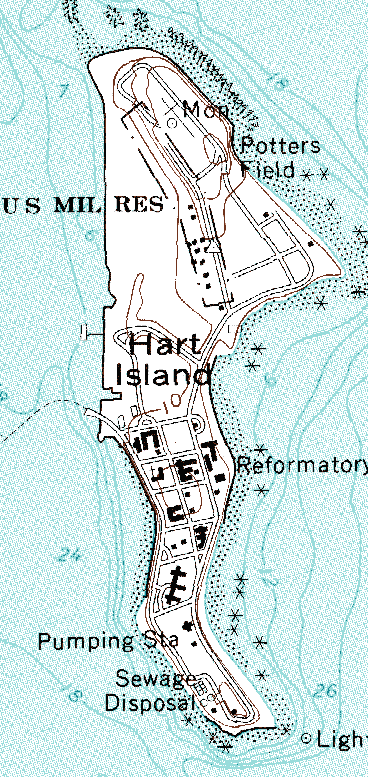
Map from 1966

Originally, City Cemetery occupied 45 acres (18 ha) on the northern and southern tips of Hart Island, while the center two-thirds of the island was habitable. In 1985, sixteen bodies of people who died from AIDS were buried in deep graves on a remote section of the southern tip of the island because at the time it was feared that their remains would be contagious. An unnamed infant victim of AIDS is buried in the only single grave on Hart Island with a concrete marker that reads SC (special case) B1 (Baby 1) 1985. Since then, thousands of people who have died of AIDS have been buried on Hart Island, but the precise number is unknown.

From 1991 to 1993, New York artist Melinda Hunt and photographer Joel Sternfeld photographed Hart Island for their book of the same name, which was published in 1998. Hunt subsequently founded the Hart Island Project organization in 1994 to help the families and friends of those buried on Hart Island. Another media work, the 2018 documentary One Million American Dreams, documents the history of Hart Island and delves briefly into the lives of various individuals buried there.

Prior to the 2022 demolitions, there had been a section of old wooden houses and masonry institutional structures dating back to the late 19th and early 20th centuries, but these buildings had fallen into disrepair. Military barracks from the Civil War period were used prior to the construction of a workhouse and of hospital facilities.

In the late 2010s, the Hart Island Project and City Island Historical Society started petitioning for Hart Island to be listed on the National Register of Historic Places (NRHP). The New York State Office of Parks, Recreation and Historic Preservation labeled the island a "site of historical significance" in 2016, given that Hart Island met three of the four criteria for being listed on the NRHP. The island was significantly affected by Hurricane Sandy in 2012, and some of the shoreline was eroded, which exposed many of the skeletons buried on the island. Following this, the city announced a restoration of the shoreline. The federal government gave $13.2 million toward the shoreline project in 2015, but the work was delayed for several years. The start of restoration was initially slated for 2020, but in August 2019, the city announced that shoreline work would begin the following month.

=== Transfer to NYC Parks ===
Control of the island passed to the New York City Department of Parks and Recreation (NYC Parks) in December 2019. Burials in the Potters' Field continued after transfer, but they were conducted by city contract workers. In June 2021, the New York City Department of Buildings issued an emergency order authorizing the demolition of eighteen buildings on the island, which the city deemed to be severely deteriorated. Sixteen of these buildings had been identified for demolition in a March 2020 report but, even then, some of these structures were also identified as being easy to repair. The New York City Department of Social Services awarded a $3.3 million contract to JPL Industries in October 2021 for the demolition of the deteriorated structures.

City officials announced in March 2023 that the island would be opened to the public at some point that year, and a touchstone memorial on the island was approved the same month. By that year, the city reported having razed and removed 15 of the island's 19 structures. NYC Parks explained that its plans for the island are to create a safer environment for island visitors to visit the island's cemeteries, but not to create a full-fledged public park. The city government hosted two public meetings in 2024 to solicit feedback on Hart Island's future use, and burials continued during this time. In July 2025, the city government announced its 20-year plan for Hart Island, which included new restrooms and a visitor center. The plan was designed by Starr Whitehouse and also included new landscaping, restorations of three memorials, and renovations to an old Catholic chapel and the island's ferry dock.

== Cemetery ==
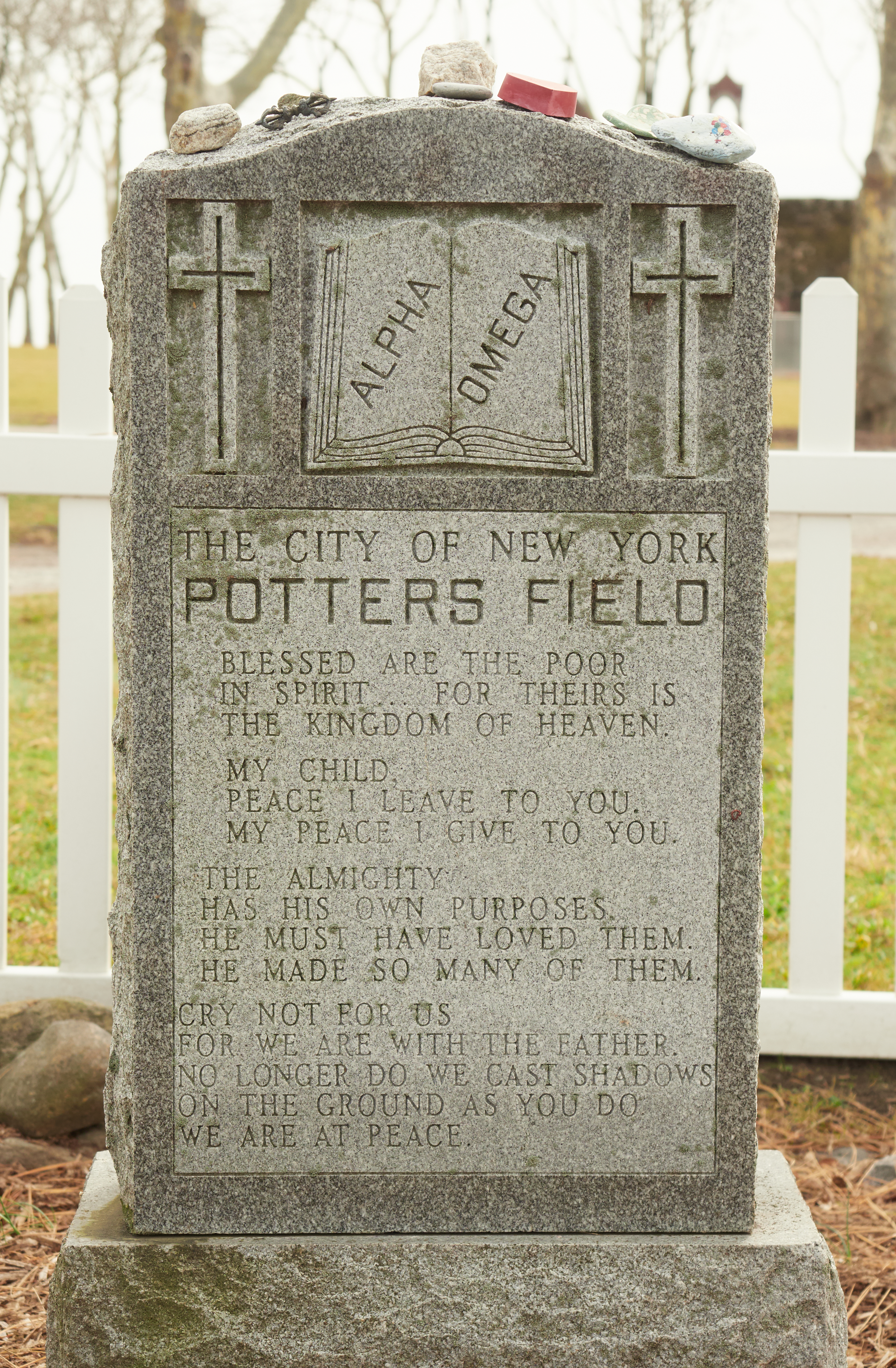
Potter's Field monument

Hart Island contains New York City's 131-acre (0.53 km^{2}) potter's field, or public cemetery (not to be confused with Potter's Field in Brooklyn). The potter's field is variously described as the largest tax-funded cemetery in the United States, the largest-such in the world, and one of the largest mass graves in the United States. At least 850,000 have been buried on the island, though since the 2000s, the burial rate has declined to fewer than 1,500 a year. According to a 2006 New York Times article, there had been 1,419 burials at the potter's field during the previous year: of these, 826 were adults, 546 were infants and stillborn babies, and 47 were dismembered body parts.

One-third of annual burials are infants and stillborn babies, which has been reduced from a proportion of one-half since the Children's Health Insurance Program began to cover all pregnant women in New York State in 1997. By the 2020s, those buried on the island came from a wider range of economic and social classes. In 2022, The Washington Post wrote that the island's recent interments included "a professional ballet dancer, a nurse, a software engineer, a scuba instructor and an acclaimed musical composer."

=== Burials ===
The dead are buried in trenches. Babies are placed in coffins, which are stacked in groups of 100, measuring five coffins deep and usually in twenty rows. Adults are placed in larger pine boxes placed according to size, and are stacked in sections of 150, measuring three coffins deep in two rows and laid out in a grid system. There are seven sizes of coffins, which range from 1 to 7 feet (0.30 to 2.13 m) long. Each box is labeled with an identification number, the person's age, ethnicity, and the place where the body was found, if applicable. Before civilian contractors began doing the actual burials in 2020, inmates from the nearby Rikers Island jail were paid fifty cents an hour to bury bodies on Hart Island.

The bodies of adults are frequently disinterred when families are able to locate their relatives through DNA, photographs and fingerprints kept on file at the Office of Chief Medical Examiner of the City of New York. There were an average of 72 disinterments per year from 2007 to 2009. As a result, the adults' coffins are staggered to expedite removal. Children, mostly infants, are rarely disinterred. Regulations stipulate that the coffins generally must remain untouched for 25 years, except in cases of disinterment.

Approximately half of the burials are of children under five who are identified and died in New York City's hospitals, where the mothers signed papers authorizing a "City Burial." The mothers were generally unaware of what the phrase meant. Many other interred have families who live abroad or out of state and whose relatives search extensively; these searches are made more difficult because burial records are currently kept within the prison system. An investigation into the handling of the infant burials was opened in response to a criminal complaint made to the New York State Attorney General's Office in 2009.

Burial records on microfilm at the Municipal Archives indicate that until 1913, burials of unknowns were in single plots, and identified adults and children were buried in mass graves. In 1913, the trenches were separated to facilitate the more frequent disinterment of adults. Coffins are stacked three deep with 150 coffins assigned to each plot, and marked with GPS coordinates. The potter's field is also used to dispose of amputated body parts, which are placed in boxes labeled "limbs". Ceremonies have not been conducted at the burial site since the 1950s. In the past, burial trenches were re-used after 25–50 years, allowing for sufficient decomposition of the remains. Since then, however, historic buildings have been demolished to make room for new burials. A tall, white peace monument was erected by New York City prison inmates at the top of a hill that was known as "Cemetery Hill" following World War II and was dedicated in October 1948.

==== Disease victims' burials ====
Hart Island has also been used for burials of disease victims during epidemics and pandemics. During the 1980s AIDS epidemic, those who had died from AIDS were the only people to be buried in separate graves. At first, bodies were delivered in body bags and buried by inmate workers wearing protective jumpsuits. When it was later discovered that the corpses could not spread HIV, the city started burying people who had died of AIDS in the mass graves. In 2008, the island was selected as a potential site for mass burials in case of a particularly extreme flu pandemic, available for up to 20,000 bodies.

COVID-19 burials on Hart Island

During the COVID-19 pandemic in New York City, Hart Island was designated as the temporary burial site for people who had died from COVID-19 if deaths overwhelmed the capacity of mortuaries. At the time, deaths at home within the city had increased significantly, though the corpses were not tested for COVID-19. Preparations for mass graves began at the end of March 2020, and private contractors were hired to replace inmate labor for mass grave burials. Although several media sources reported in April 2020 that burials had begun, New York City mayor Bill de Blasio clarified that Hart Island was only being used to bury unclaimed corpses, as well as the bodies of those who chose it as a burial place. In 2021, the website The City published an analysis that found there was a sharp increase in the number of interments between 2019, when 846 corpses were buried on the island, and 2020, when 2,334 corpses were buried.

=== Records ===
Many burial records were destroyed by arson in late July 1977. Remaining records of burials before 1977 were transferred to the Municipal Archives in Manhattan; while records after that date are still kept in handwritten ledgers, these are now transcribed into a digital database that is partially available online. A Freedom of Information Act (FOIA) request for 50,000 burial records was granted to the Hart Island Project in 2008. A lawsuit, concerning "place of death" information redacted from the Hart Island burial records, was filed against New York City's government in July 2008 and was settled out of court in January 2009.

=== Notable people buried ===
Those interred on Hart Island are not necessarily homeless or indigent. Many of the dead either had families who could not afford the expenses of private funerals or were not claimed by relatives within a month of death. Notable burials include the playwright, film screenwriter, and director Leo Birinski, who was buried there in 1951 after dying alone and in poverty, and painter Mihri Müşfik Hanım, who was buried in 1954 after dying penniless. The American novelist Dawn Powell was buried on Hart Island in 1970, five years after her death, after her remains had been used for medical studies and the executor of her estate refused to reclaim them. Academy Award winner Bobby Driscoll, who was found dead in 1968 in an East Village tenement, was buried on Hart Island because his remains could not be identified in a timely fashion. T-Bone Slim, the labor activist, songwriter, and Wobbly, was buried on Hart Island after his body was found floating in the Hudson River in 1942. The composer Noah Creshevsky was interred on Hart Island in 2020 at his own request because, according to his husband David Sachs, Creshevsky wanted to protest the trappings and cost of traditional funerals.

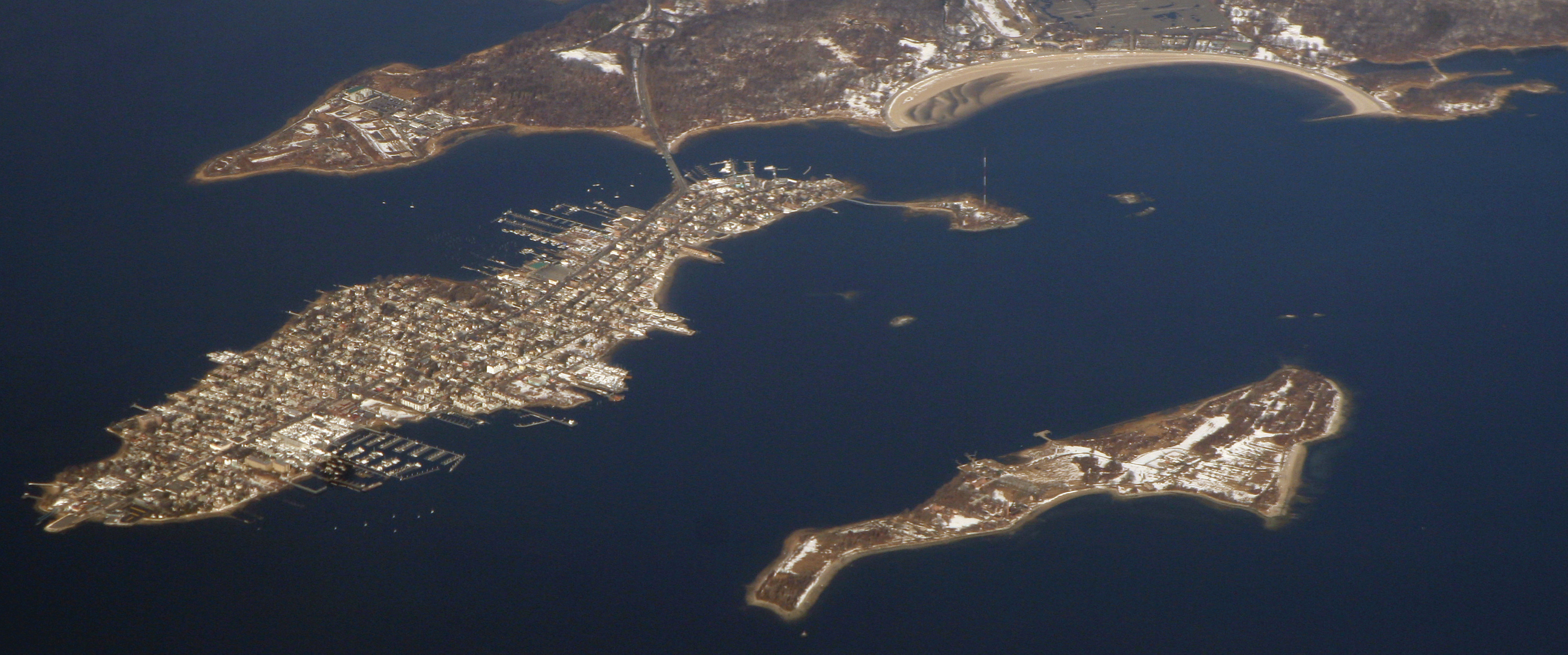
Aerial view facing west showing Hart Island (lower right), with City Island (left) and part of the mainland Bronx (top), in 2010

== Public engagement ==
=== Hart Island Project ===
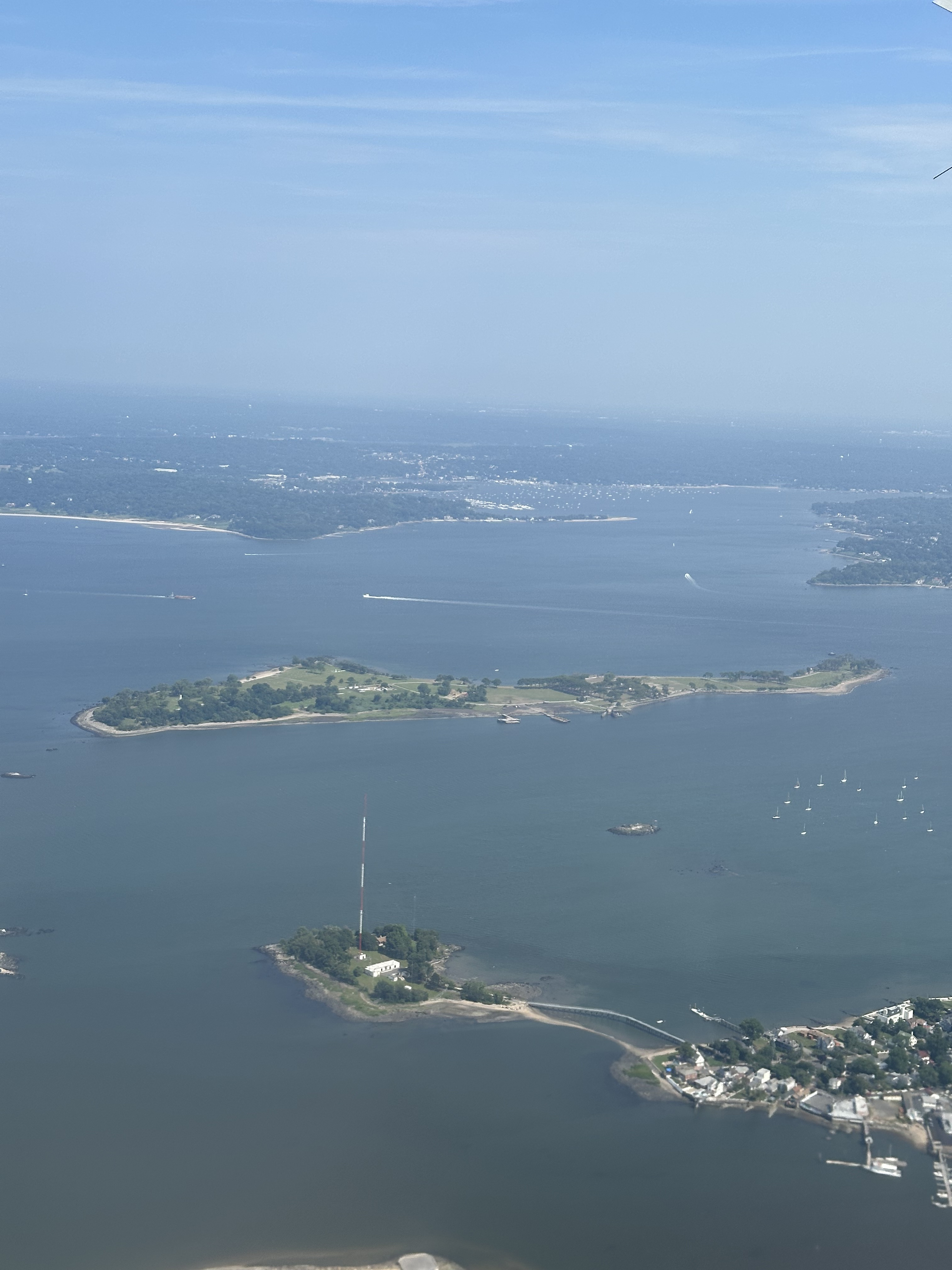
Aerial view of Hart and High Islands, 2024

Founded by New York artist Melinda Hunt in 1994, (Note: According to the project's website, it was not incorporated as a charity until 2011.) the Hart Island Project is a nonprofit organization devoted to improving access to the island and its burial data. The organization helps families obtain copies of public burial records; arranges visits to grave sites; and operates a website to help people find relatives interred on the island. Historian Thomas Laqueur writes:

Woody Guthrie's song about the unnamed Mexican migrant dead has had a long resonant history. Hunt, in an emotionally related gesture, has researched, for years, in order to publish the names of as many as 850,000 paupers who lie in 101 acres of Hart Island where the city buries its anonymous dead.

Since 2009, the city has given burial records for the island to the Hart Island Project. In turn, the organization maintains an online database of burial records from 1980 onward. The project has led to reforms of access to Hart Island such as opening the island monthly to everyone and legislation that requires the Department of Correction to publish burial records online.

The Hart Island Project has digitally mapped grave trenches using Global Positioning System (GPS) data. In 2014, an interactive map with GPS burial data and storytelling software, "clocks of anonymity" was released as the "Traveling Cloud Museum", which collects publicly submitted stories of those who are listed in the burial records. Traveling Cloud Museum was updated in 2018 to include a map created with GeoTIFF images collected by a drone. The map displays nearly 69,000 intact burials and allows people who knew the deceased to add stories, photographs, epitaphs, songs and videos linked to a personal profile, as well as identify those who died of AIDS-related illnesses.

In 2012, Westchester Community College hosted an art exhibition of people whose graves were located through the Hart Island Project with Hunt's help. The Hart Island Project also collaborated with British landscape architects Ann Sharrock and Ian Fisher to present a landscape strategy to the New York City Council and the Parks Department. Sharrock introduced the concept that Hart Island is a natural burial facility and outlined a growing interest in green burials in urban settings.

In 2023, the podcast Radio Diaries created an eight-episode series, "The Unmarked Graveyard: Stories from Hart Island". The series tells the stories of people buried on the island, including the satirist writer and playwright Dawn Powell.

=== Legislation ===
On October 28, 2011, the New York City Council Committee on Fire and Criminal Justice held a hearing titled "Oversight: Examining the Operation of Potter's Field by the N.Y.C., Department of Correction on Hart Island". Legislation passed in 2013 requires the Department of Correction to make two sets of documents available on the Internet: a database of burials and a visitation policy. In April 2013, the Department of Correction published an online database of burials on the island. The database contains data about all persons buried on the island since 1977 and is composed of 66,000 entries.

==== Transfer to Parks Department ====
A bill to transfer jurisdiction to the New York City Department of Parks and Recreation was introduced on April 30, 2012. The Hart Island Project testified in favor of this bill on September 27, 2012, but the bill was not passed.

The bill was reintroduced in March 2014, and Bill 0134 had a public hearing on January 20, 2016. The bill ultimately failed because neither the Parks Department nor the Department of Correction supported the move. The Parks Department stated that the operation of an active cemetery was outside its purview while the Department of Correction preferred that another city agency take control of Hart Island.

In 2018, City Council member Ydanis Rodríguez and three colleagues re-introduced the bill a second time. In supporting the bill, Rodriguez stated that he wanted relatives of Hart Island's deceased to be able to access their loved ones' graves. The bill was passed in the New York City Council in November 2019, with most council members voting in favor of transferring jurisdiction to the Parks Department. The following month, mayor Bill de Blasio signed the legislation, as well as three other bills, including one that would allow the ferry service to be operated by the New York City Department of Transportation. NYC Parks finally assumed full control of the island in July 2021.

== Access ==
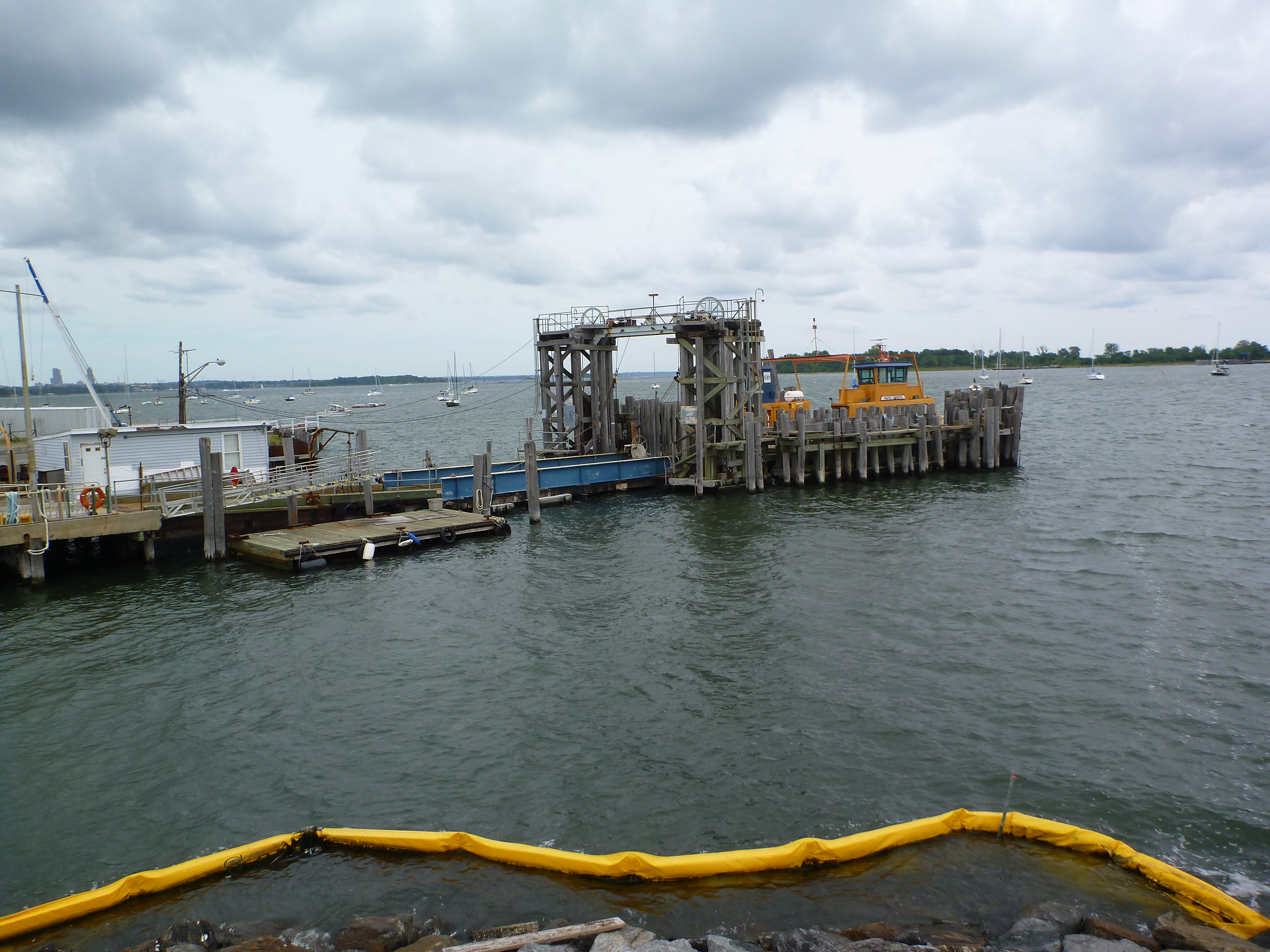
Hart Island ferry pier

The only access to Hart Island is by ferryboat. Hart Island and the pier on Fordham Street on City Island are restricted areas under the jurisdiction of the New York City Department of Correction. Family members who wish to visit the island must request a visit ahead of time with the Department of Correction. The city government allows family members to visit the island and leave mementos at grave sites, and maintains an online and telephone system for family members to schedule grave site visits. Other members of the public are permitted to visit by prior appointment only.

=== Ferry service ===
The city formerly operated a 24/7 ferry service between City and Hart islands, which ran every forty-five minutes during the day and less frequently at night. The ferries also transported corpses. By the 1960s, two ferryboats were used for the Hart Island ferry service; the Michael Cosgrove (built 1961) and the Fordham (in service 1922–1982). The service was extremely expensive to operate; in 1967, about 1,500 people per month used the service and the city spent $300,000 per year to keep it running. By 1977, the city had discontinued frequent ferry service and provided seven trips a day. The Department of Correction offered one guided tour of the island in 2000. Under legislation enacted in 2019, the New York City Department of Transportation was to operate the ferry at a higher frequency; as of 2024, the island is served by ferries twice a month.

=== Loosening of restrictions ===
The process of visiting the island has been improved due to efforts by the Hart Island Project and the New York Civil Liberties Union. An ecumenical group named the Interfaith Friends of Potter's Field and another organization called Picture the Homeless has also advocated for making the island more accessible. The Department of Correction opposed further loosening of restrictions on accessing Hart Island; a 2016 The New York Times article quoted a Corrections official as saying: "As long as D.O.C. runs the facility, we are going to run it with the D.O.C. mentality".

In July 2015, the Department of Correction instituted a new policy, wherein up to five family members and their guests were allowed to visit grave sites on one weekend per month. The first visit took place on July 19, 2015. Visits to individual graves, which take place twice a month, are restricted to individuals who had a close relationship with the deceased. Monthly guided visits to Hart Island's gazebo were available to the general public. The ferry leaves from a restricted dock on City Island. In 2017, the city government increased the maximum number of visitors per month from 50 to 70. During the COVID-19 pandemic, the public was not allowed to visit Hart Island; though visits resumed in May 2021, the number of visitors allowed on each ferry trip was decreased to ten.

=== NYC Parks control ===
In July 2021, responsibility for the island was finally fully transferred from the Department of Correction to NYC Parks. As part of the Hart Island Transportation Study, which sought to improve access to the island, NYC Parks conducted public meetings in early 2022. Four alternatives were presented: a shuttle bus service from Orchard Beach to the Fordham Street ferry pier; a shuttle bus service from the New York City Subway's Pelham Bay Park station, stopping at Orchard Beach and Fordham Street; a new ferry service from Ferry Point Park to the island; and an extension of NYC Ferry's Soundview route from Ferry Point Park to the island.

Even after NYC Parks took over the island, Bloomberg reported in October 2021 that there had been little change in the conditions for visitors. The New York City Parks Department has explained that its plans for the island are to create a safer environment for cemetery and island visitors, but not to create a full-fledged public park.

== See also ==
- Davids Island (New York)
- Geography and environment of New York City
- Postage stamps and postal history of the Confederate States#Prisoner of war prisons and camps
