= Big Tom (disambiguation) =

Big Tom was an Irish singer and musician.

Big Tom may also refer to:

== Geography ==
- Big Tom (New York), a mountain in the Catskill Mountains of New York
- Big Tom, a summit in the Black Mountains (North Carolina), named after hunter and guide Thomas "Big Tom" Wilson (1825–1909)
- Big Tom, Bronx, a submerged rock in Eastchester Bay, the Bronx, New York
- Big Tom Lake, Two Inlets Township, Becker County, Minnesota
- Eastside Big Tom's, a hamburger restaurant in Olympia, Washington

== Nickname ==
- Tom Brown (police chief) (1889–1959), corrupt police chief of St. Paul, Minnesota, in the 1930s
- Thomas F. Foley (1852–1925), American politician and saloon owner in New York City (see List of identities in The Gangs of New York (book)#Politicians)
- Tom Moody (born 1965), Australian cricket coach and former first-class cricketer
- Tom O'Reilly (Cavan politician) (1915–1995), Irish Gaelic footballer, politician and farmer
- Tom Phillips (baseball) (1889–1929), American Major League Baseball pitcher
- Thomas Rienzi (1919–2010), United States Army major general
- Fyodor Sergeyev (1883–1921), Russian revolutionary, Soviet politician, agitator and journalist

== Arts and entertainment ==
- Big Tom, a character in the television series The Good Guys (1968–1970), played by Alan Hale Jr.
- "Big Tom", a 1959 episode of the radio series Gunsmoke
- "Big Tom", a 1960 episode of the television series Gunsmoke
- Big Tom, a one-act religious play by Ernest Ferlita

== Horses ==
- Big Tom, disqualified winner of the 1968 Apple Blossom Handicap Thoroughbred horse race
- Big Tom, a horse that set the track record for Balmoral Park, Illinois in 2000

== Other uses ==
- "Big Tom: the World's Largest Turkey", a statue in Frazee, Minnesota
- Big Tom, a variety of pumpkin - see List of pumpkin varieties grown in the United States
