= USS Josephine =

USS Josephine has been the name of more than one United States Navy ship, and may refer to:

- USS Josephine (SP-913), later USS SP-913, a patrol vessel in commission from 1917 to 1918
- USS Josephine (SP-1243), a patrol vessel in commission from 1917 to 1918
- USS Josephine (SP-3295), a patrol vessel in commission from 1918 to 1919

== See also ==
- USS Josephine H. II (SP-245)
