= HYC =

HYC could refer to:

- Hok Yau Club (學友社), an NGO in Hong Kong
- Howard Chu, core developer of OpenLDAP
- Hyde Central railway station, a rail station in England
- Hold Your Colour, an album from the band Pendulum
- Harlem Yacht Club
- Wycombe Air Park, which has the IATA code HYC
