= Big Tom, Bronx =

Big Tom is a submerged rock in Eastchester Bay, The Bronx, one quarter mile west of Belden Point. It is only visible at very low tide, however it is nonetheless referred to in historical journals. It is thought to be named after Thomas Pell who owned City Island. It is the only serious hazard to navigation in that part of the Bay.

== See also ==
- Cuban Ledge
