= USS Elmasada =

United States Navy patrol vessel

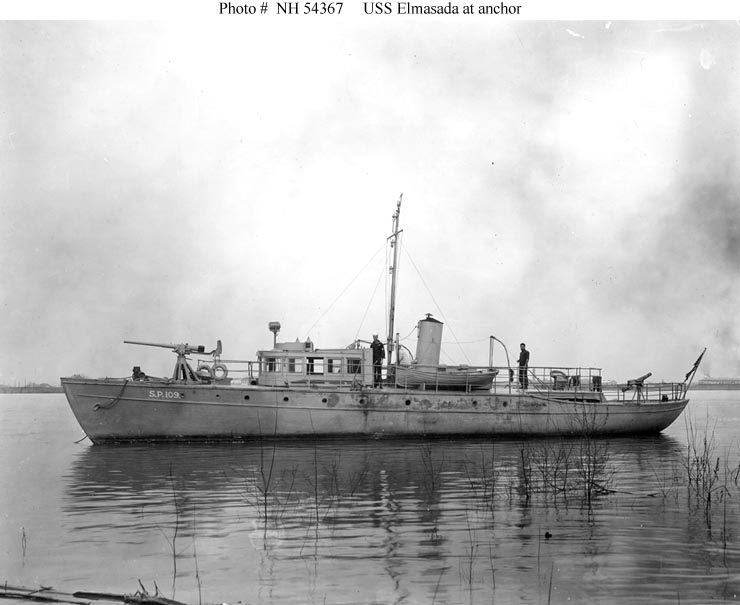
- USS Elmasada

History

United States
- Name: USS Elmasada
- Namesake: Previous name retained
- Builder: Robert Jacobs, City Island, New York
- Completed: 1909
- Acquired: May 1917
- Commissioned: 4 June 1917
- Stricken: 20 May 1919
- Fate: Transferred to United States Lighthouse Service June 1919
- Notes: Operated as private motorboat Elmasada 1909-1917

General characteristics
- Type: Patrol vessel
- Tonnage: 47 Gross register tons
- Length: 66 ft (20 m) or 75 ft (23 m)
- Beam: 15 ft 2 in (4.62 m)
- Draft: 4 ft (1.2 m)
- Speed: 9 knots
- Complement: 12
- Armament: 1 × 3-pounder gun

USS Elmasada (SP-109) was an armed motorboat that served in the United States Navy as a patrol vessel from 1917 to 1919.

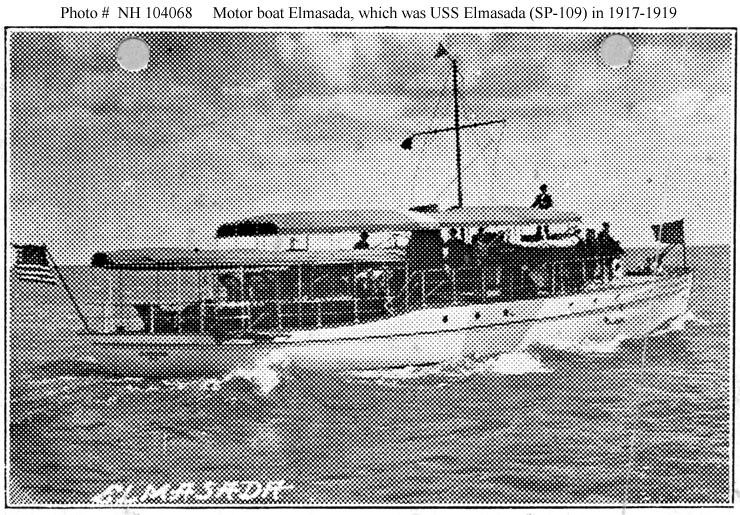
Elmasada in civilian use sometime between 1909 and 1917, prior to her U.S. Navy service.

Elmasada was built as a civilian motorboat in 1909 by Robert Jacobs at City Island, New York for C. B. Fox of New Orleans, LA.

In mid-May 1917 her owner, C.B. Fox of New Orleans, Louisiana, was ordered to turn her over to the U.S. Navy for use as a patrol boat during World War I. The Navy purchased her from Fox later in May and commissioned her on 4 June 1917 as USS Elmasada (SP-109).

Elmasada was attached to the 8th Naval District and employed in patrol and transport duties in the New Orleans area.

Elmasada was stricken from the Navy List on 20 May 1919 and transferred to the United States Lighthouse Service at New Orleans in June 1919 and renamed USLHT Cosmos. She was decommissioned in 1936 and sold on 24 June 1936. Her fate is unknown.
