= Grace Episcopal Church (Bronx) =

Episcopal church in the Bronx, New York

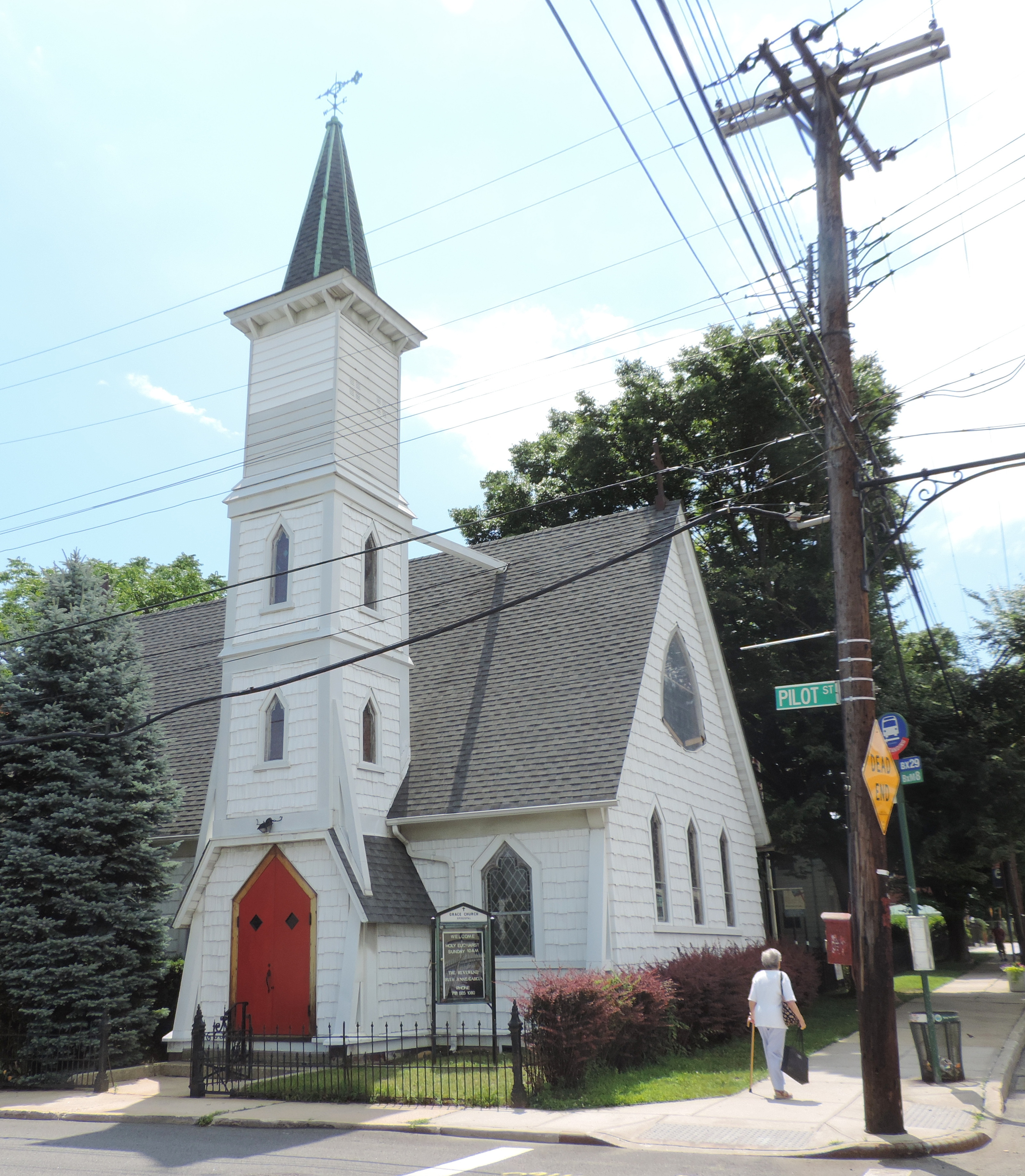
- Grace Episcopal Church
- 40°50′28″N 73°47′2.5″W
- Location: 116 City Island Avenue, City Island, The Bronx, New York City
- Country: United States
- Language: American English
- Denomination: Episcopal
- Website: gracecityisland.net

History
- Status: Active
- Founded: 1862; 164 years ago

Architecture
- Style: Church: Carpenter Gothic, Rectory: Italianate
- Years built: 1862; 164 years ago

Administration
- Province: International Atlantic Province (Province 2)
- Diocese: Episcopal Diocese of New York
- Grace Episcopal Church
- U.S. National Register of Historic Places
- Location within New York City Location within New York Location within the United States
- Location: 116 City Island Ave., Bronx, New York
- Area: less than one acre
- Built: 1862 (for church); c.1862 (for rectory)
- Architectural style: Gothic Revival
- NRHP reference No.: 06000820
- Added to NRHP: September 13, 2006

Grace Episcopal Church is a historic Episcopal church at 116 City Island Avenue in The Bronx, New York, New York. The church was built in 1862 in the Carpenter Gothic style, and the rectory was built around that year in the Italian Villa style.

The church reported 57 members in 2015 and 40 members in 2025. Plate and pledge income reported for the congregation in 2025 was $49,685 with average Sunday attendance (ASA) of 328 persons.

The complex was added to the National Register of Historic Places in 2006.
