= Public School 17 =

- U.S. National Register of Historic Places
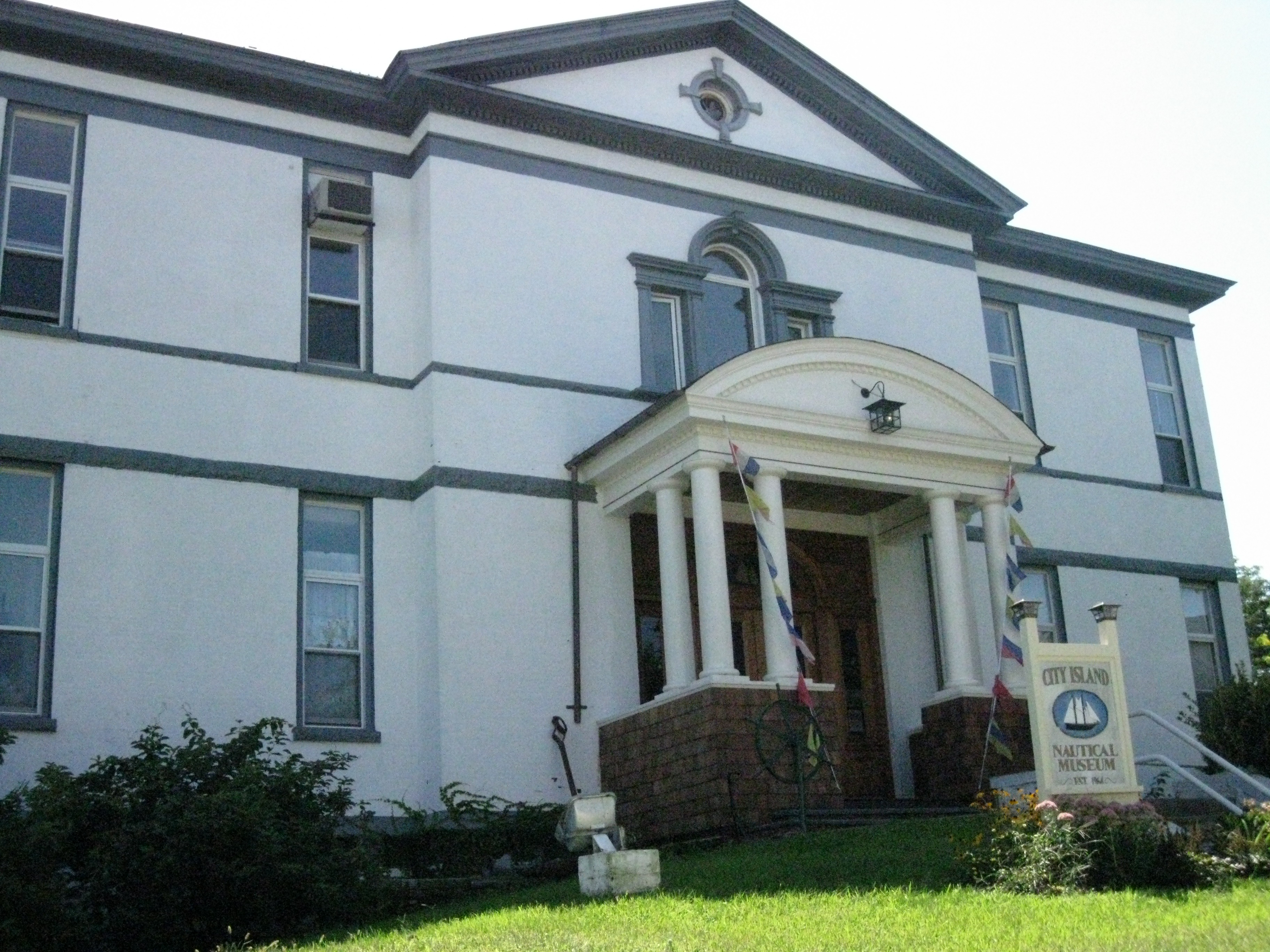
- City Island Historical Society and Nautical Museum, September 2009

- Location within New York City Location within New York Location within the United States
- Location: 190 Fordham Street, Bronx, New York
- Coordinates: 40°50′51″N 73°47′4″W
- Area: less than one acre
- Built: 1897
- Architects: Snyder, C. B. J.
- Architectural style: Gothic, Neo-Georgian
- NRHP reference No.: 84002065
- Added to NRHP: September 27, 1984

Public School 17 is a historic school located at City Island in the Bronx, New York City. It was designed by architect C. B. J. Snyder (1860–1945) and built in 1897 in the Neo-Georgian style. A rear addition was built in 1930. It is a two-story, five-bay brick building on a high basement. It features a shallow wooden entrance porch with Doric order columns.

It served as a school until 1975. The City Island Nautical Museum opened in 1976, and when New York City sold the building to developer Haim Joseph for $500,000 in the 1980s to develop into condominium apartments, the museum and a community center received a 99-year rent-free lease, and reopened in 1995 after renovations.

It was listed on the National Register of Historic Places in 1984.

A fire allegedly set by vandals on July 13, 2007, damaged the building's façade.

== City Island Nautical Museum ==
The City Island Nautical Museum is operated by the City Island Historical Society, which aims to preserve the island's nautical heritage. Exhibits include photos and artifacts about life on the island, its residents, the local yacht building companies, schools and local landmarks. The museum is open on weekend afternoons.

== See also ==
- List of maritime museums in the United States
