= USS Josephine H. II =

Patrol vessel of the United States Navy

History

United States
- Name: USS Josephine H. II
- Namesake: Previous name retained
- Builder: Bosserdet Yacht and Engine Company
- Completed: 1912
- Acquired: July 1917
- Commissioned: 3 August 1917
- Decommissioned: 29 November 1918
- Fate: Returned to owner 11 March 1919
- Notes: Operated as civilian motorboat Josephine H. II 1912-1917 and from 1919

General characteristics
- Type: Patrol vessel
- Length: 65 ft (20 m)
- Beam: 12 ft 6 in (3.81 m)
- Draft: 4 ft 8 in (1.42 m)
- Speed: 12 Knots
- Armament: None

For similarly named ships, see USS Josephine.

USS Josephine H. II (SP-245) was a United States Navy patrol vessel in commission from 1917 to 1918.

Josephine H. II was built as a civilian motorboat of the same name in 1912 by the Bosserdet Yacht and Engine Company. The U.S. Navy acquired her from her owners, John R. Shuman et al., in July 1917 for World War I service as a patrol vessel. She was commissioned on 3 August 1917 as USS Josephine H. II (SP-245).

Based at Detroit, Michigan, Josephine H. II was assigned to the 9th Naval District, 10th Naval District, and 11th Naval District—a single administrative entity at the time—for duty on the section patrol. She performed guard duty and regulated traffic on the Detroit River and in Lake St. Clair for the remainder of World War I.

Josephine H. II was decommissioned on 29 November 1918. She was returned to Shuman and his co-owners on 11 March 1919.
