= Harlem Yacht Club =

Yacht club in New York, United States

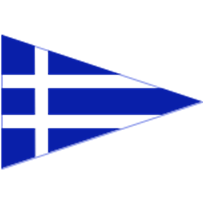
- Burgee
- Short name: HYC
- Founded: 1883
- Location: City Island, New York United States
- Website: www.hyc.org

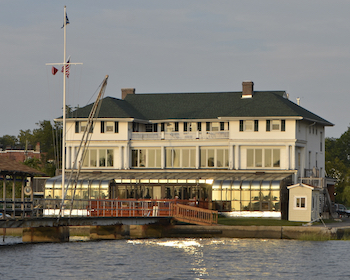
Photo of Harlem Yacht Club, City Island, NY from Eastchester Bay

The Harlem Yacht Club (HYC) is a yacht club on City Island in the New York City borough of The Bronx. Incorporated in 1883, it is the third oldest continuously functioning yacht club in the City of New York, following The New York Yacht Club (founded in 1844) and the Williamsburgh Yacht Club (founded in 1871). The club currently has over 100 enrolled members in various membership categories.

== History ==
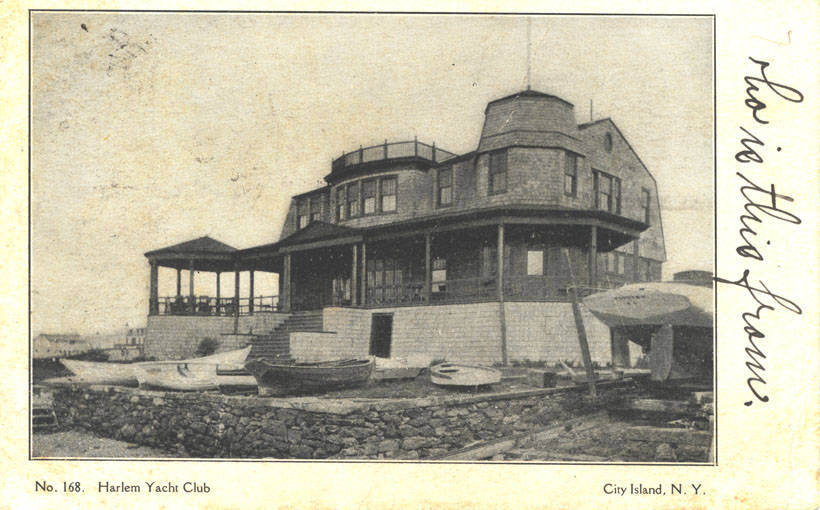
Harlem Yacht Club City Island NY, 1906

The Harlem Yacht Club was originally one of several boating clubs founded in the 19th century on the banks of the Harlem River in upper Manhattan, where it established its first clubhouse at the foot of 121st Street. Over the next two decades, the club grew and acquired a station at College Point, Queens, where most of its races and regattas took place. In 1894, the club sold the station at College Point while establishing a new one on property it had purchased on City Island, as its membership grew.

For the next ten years, the club occupied both locations – a clubhouse in Manhattan and its City Island station on Hunter Avenue. In 1898, the club began building a Victorian-era clubhouse on City Island, which opened in June of the following year. Its opening was heralded by a "salute of seventeen guns ... an illumination [of the fleet], and fireworks ashore and afloat." By 1901, The New York Times noted that, "...in place of the fishing smacks and oyster boats that once anchored in East Chester Bay is the fleet of the Harlem Yacht Club." In 1903, the club gave up its location in Manhattan, which was taken over by the newly formed Metropolitan Yacht Club.

The City Island clubhouse built in 1898 was destroyed by fire on May 29, 1915, and was replaced by the club's current three-story structure that same year. The destroyed building was valued at $15,000. Contents lost included the Brooklyn Yacht Club's Deep Sea Challenge Cup. This trophy, presented by Thomas Lipton, had been won by club member J.A. Crowley, in 1913. Also lost was equipment and records needed to run the annual regatta. The nearby New Rochelle Yacht Club (no longer extant) loaned HYC the required equipment to run the regatta that year.

=== Early influence on Long Island Sound yacht racing ===
The HYC was an early driving force in the evolution of sailing in the New York area, and a founding member of three yacht racing associations: The New York Yacht Racing Association (no longer extant), the Yacht Racing Association of Long Island Sound (YRALIS), and the Eastchester Bay Yacht Racing Association (EBYRA). The latter two are still active today.

HYC conducted numerous regattas and became known locally for its Memorial Day Regatta. Conducted on its own initially, this regatta later became part of the YRALIS championship circuit. For over 60 years, this race was considered to be the start of the yacht racing season in western Long Island Sound. In 1892, seventy yachts participated in the event.

In its 1911 YRALIS Memorial Day regatta, the HYC hosted the first regatta of the Star class – a small fixed-keel sloop which was established as an Olympic Games class in 1932, and is still raced today. In that same year, the New York Herald reported on the Stratford Shoal Race: "Fast time was made by the twenty-six yachts that took part in the annual Stratford Shoal races of the Harlem Yacht Club, which were started from off the Execution Light..." As was common in that era, the race had both power and sail divisions.

In 1921, forty-three yachts, in twelve classes ranging from Herreshoff-designed New York Yacht Club Fifties to sailing canoes, participated in HYC's thirty-ninth annual regatta. The NYYC Fifty class was so evenly matched that after sailing the 15-1/2 nm triangle course in just shy of two and a quarter hours, the last place boat finished only one minute and forty seconds after the leader. The regatta was sailed in a nine- to twelve-knot northwesterly and lumpy seas left over from a northeasterly wind that morning.

== The club today ==
Today the Harlem Yacht Club has a diverse membership that is drawn primarily from New York City, Westchester County, NY and New Jersey, and conducts an active calendar of racing and cruising events for owners of sailboats and powerboats. Many of the boats are kept in the club's large mooring field in Eastchester Bay. The club operates an active restaurant and bar on its premises.

== Cannon noise controversy ==
In 2000, the club was involved in a legal battle regarding the traditional colors ceremony. Following long-standing tradition at many yacht clubs, a cannon would be fired at sunset to signal that the American flag was about to be lowered for the day, and that all those present should stand with respect.

A complaint was filed against the club due to the noise of the cannon firing. The New York City Environmental Control Board ruled that the sound of the cannon violated city noise ordinances. The club argued that the firing of the cannon was a patriotic expression and thus constitutionally protected free speech. In 2007, an appellate court ruled that the noise levels produced did indeed violate the Administrative Code of City of NY, but that the club could still fire the cannon, but only at reduced sound levels.
