= USS Josephine (SP-3295) =

Patrol vessel of the United States Navy

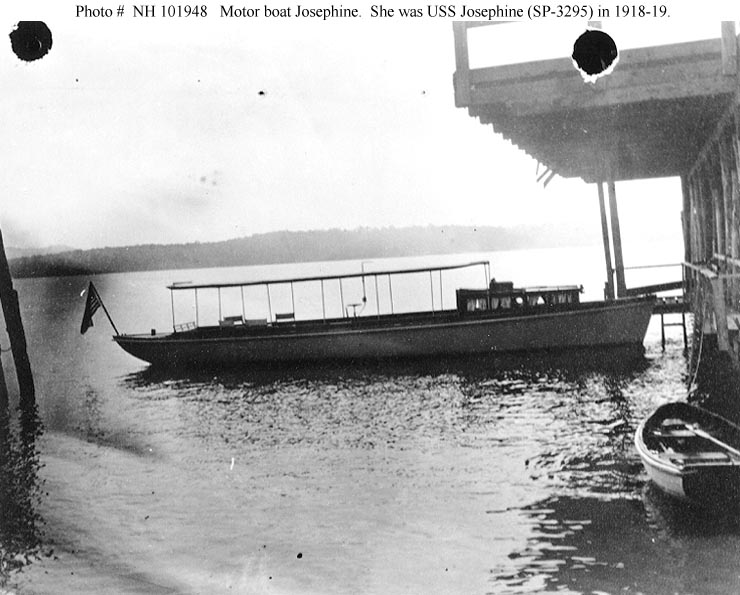
- Josephine as a civilian motorboat sometime between 1913 and 1917, prior to her U.S. Navy service.

History

United States
- Name: USS Josephine
- Namesake: Previous name retained
- Builder: Jacob Shipyard, City Island, the Bronx, New York
- Completed: 1913
- Acquired: 30 October 1918
- Fate: Returned to owner 3 January 1919
- Notes: Operated as civilian motorboat Josephine 1913-1918 and from 1919

General characteristics
- Type: Patrol vessel and harbor craft
- Length: 48 ft (15 m)
- Beam: 8 ft 6 in (2.59 m)
- Draft: 4 ft (1.2 m)
- Propulsion: Gasoline engine
- Speed: 12 knots

The third USS Josephine (SP-3295) was a United States Navy patrol vessel in commission from 1918 to 1919.

Josephine was built as a civilian motorboat of the same name in 1913 by Jacob Shipyard at City Island in the Bronx, New York. The U.S. Navy acquired her from her owner, Frank L. Sample Sr., on 30 October 1918 for World War I service as a patrol vessel. She was commissioned as USS Josephine (SP-3295).

Assigned to the 3rd Naval District, Josephine served on the section patrol as a patrol and harbor craft in the New York City area. World War I ended on 11 November 1918, twelve days after the Navy acquired Josephine, but she remained in service for a short time after the war before being decommissioned.

The Navy returned Josephine to Sample on 3 January 1919.

Josephine should not be confused with two other patrol vessels, USS Josephine (SP-913) and USS Josephine (SP-1243), which also were in commission in the U.S. Navy during World War I.
