= City Island Bridge =

Bridge in New York City

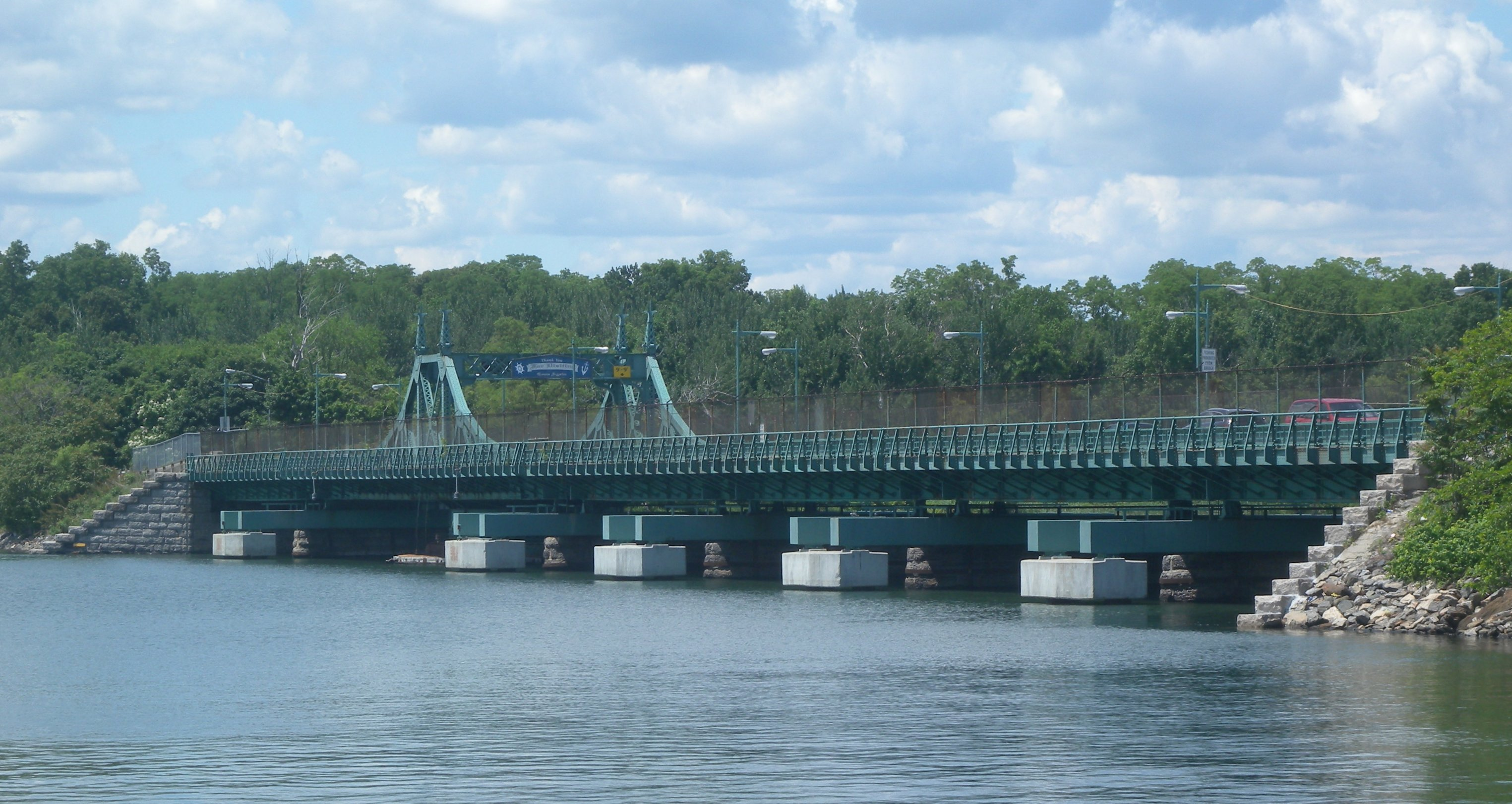
- The 1901-built City Island Bridge as seen in June 2012
- Coordinates: 40°51′23″N 73°47′36″W
- Carries: 3 lanes of City Island Road
- Crosses: Eastchester Bay
- Locale: The Bronx and City Island in New York City
- Maintained by: New York City Department of Transportation

Characteristics
- Design: Swing bridge
- Material: Steel and stone
- Total length: 950 feet (290 m)
- No. of spans: 7
- Piers in water: 6
- Clearance below: 8 feet (2.4 m)

History
- Construction start: 1899
- Opened: July 4, 1901
- Closed: December 18, 2015

Statistics
- Daily traffic: 14,473 (2016)

Location
- Interactive map of City Island Bridge

City Island Causeway
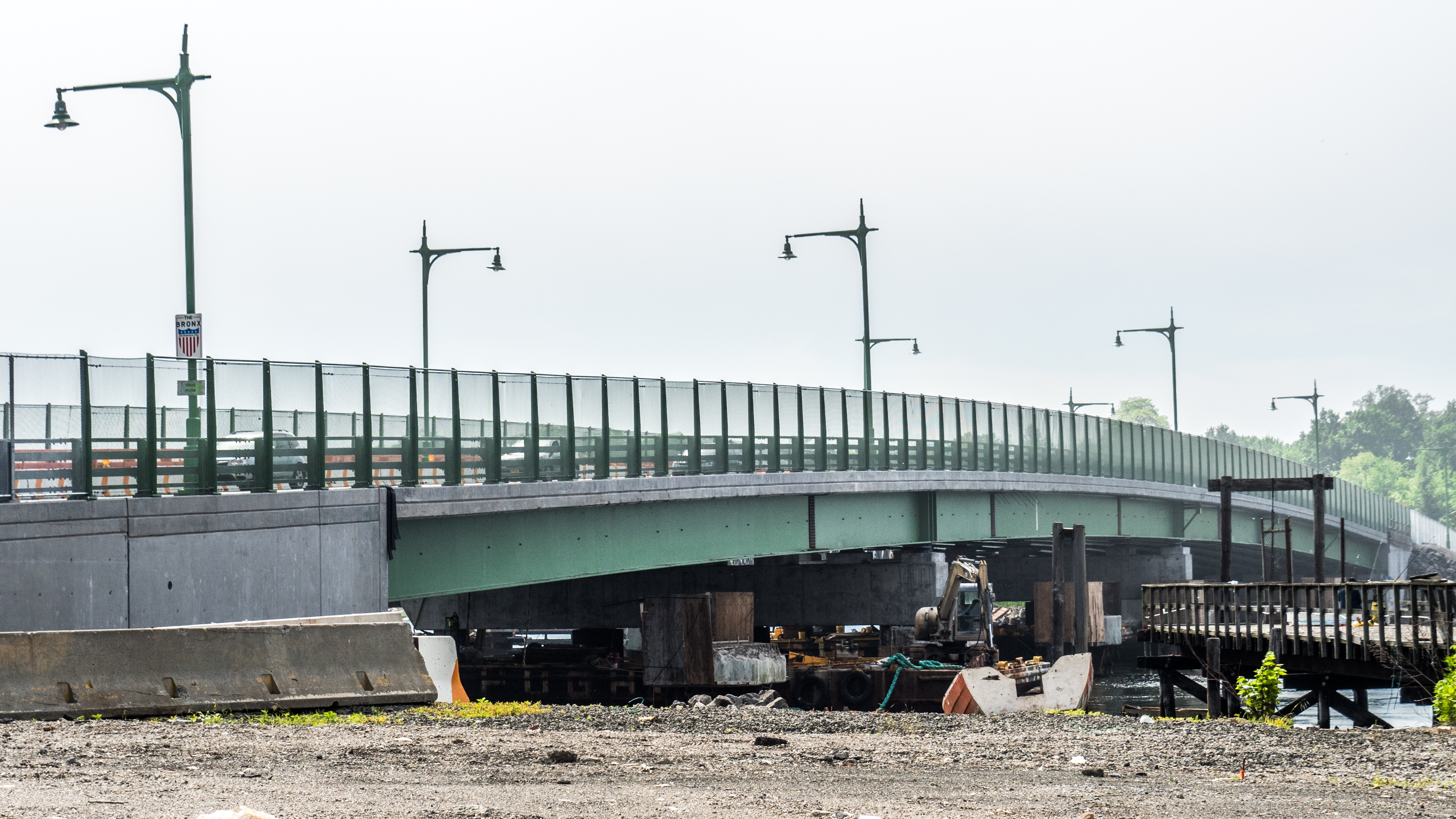
- Coordinates: 40°51′23″N 73°47′36″W
- Carries: 3 lanes of City Island Road
- Crosses: Eastchester Bay
- Locale: The Bronx and City Island in New York City
- Maintained by: New York City Department of Transportation

Characteristics
- Design: Causeway

History
- Construction start: 2015
- Opened: October 29, 2017

Location
- Interactive map of City Island Causeway

The City Island Bridge is a bridge in the New York City borough of the Bronx, connecting City Island with Rodman's Neck on the mainland. The original bridge, which carried vehicles from 1901 to 2015, was replaced by the current bridge (also called the City Island Causeway), which opened in 2017. A temporary bridge was used for the demolition and construction period between the original and new bridges.

== Old bridge ==
Since the American Revolutionary War, there have been plans to link City Island with the mainland via means of a bridge. Before the original bridge named "City Island Bridge" was opened, there was another, unnamed bridge connecting City Island with the rest of the Bronx. The opening date of this first bridge is unclear; some sources attest that it opened in 1873, while one letter states that it opened in 1857—a disputed date since the letter's writer may have been referring to a past date. This first bridge, which was definitely under planning in the 1860s, was listed in an 1872 map. It was a tolled drawbridge that was built partly out of wood from the USS North Carolina. This bridge was located north of the 1899 bridge and connected to City Island at Bridge Street. When the New York City Department of Parks and Recreation took over Pelham Bay Park in 1888, it claimed responsibility for maintenance over the western end of the bridge, which was located in the park.

Construction of the next City Island Bridge, which was the first with that name, was begun in 1898 and completed in 1901. Built of stone and steel, it spanned 950 ft (290 m) and had a projected cost of $200,000, equivalent to $7,740,000 in 2025. The bridge had five fixed spans and a central swing section, through which ships could pass. As originally built, the bridge's City Island end connected to City Island Avenue rather than at Bridge Street, and was located partially on landfill. The bridge was the sole entry and exit for vehicles on City Island. As such, it served both as a landmark and a gateway to City Island.

The swing section was deactivated and turned into a fixed span in 1963. In 1978–1979, a proposed renovation would have detonated explosives on the corroding piers, but the plan was altered so that the piers would get heavy refurbishment instead.

By 2002, the bridge was in bad shape, and city leaders held a meeting about the deteriorating bridge, showing images of corrosion on the supports, although the corrosion had since been fixed by that time. The bridge, which had been inspected in July 1999, had been deemed capable of carrying up to 50 long tons (56 short tons). The city leaders listed four options for the bridge's future: one entailed renovating the existing span, while the other three were for new spans. The new span proposals included a conventional causeway-style bridge with four piers; an arch bridge with large foundations on either side of the water; and a cable-stayed bridge with a tower either 240 or 450 feet (73 or 137 m) high.

== Replacement ==
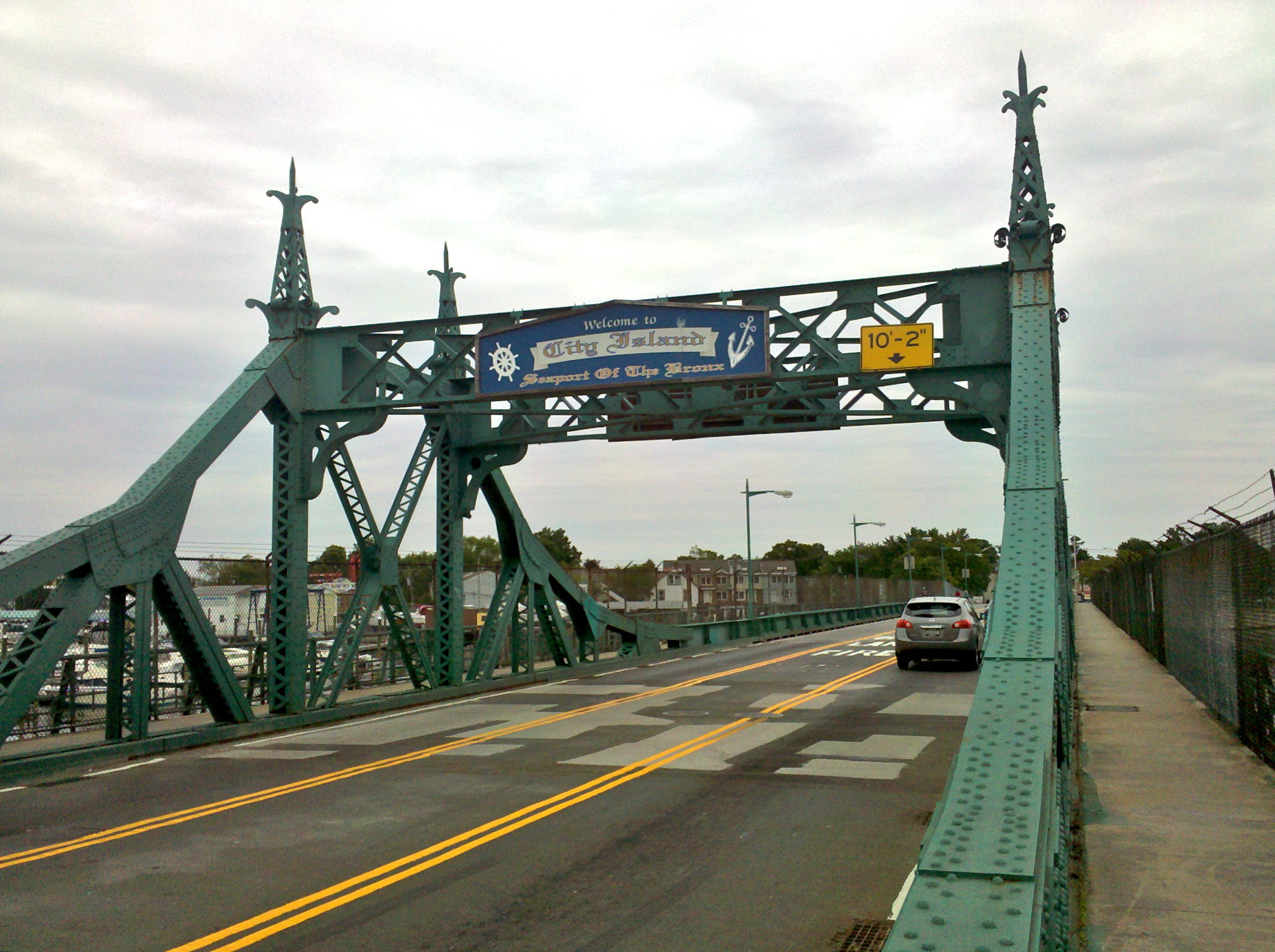
Sidewalk view of the now demolished 1901 bridge with "Welcome to City Island" sign

To replace the deteriorating bridge, the city originally intended to build a cable-stayed bridge, with a 150 ft (46 m) high tower, 13 ft (4.0 m) wide at the top, with a base of 26 ft (7.9 m). Vertical clearance above high water would be 12 ft (3.7 m). The new bridge would be located in the same footprint as the existing bridge, although it would be 17 ft (5.2 m) wider to accommodate three standard-width traffic lanes, a bicycle lane and a pedestrian walkway.

The original schedule was for the project to begin in 2007 with completion in 2010. The project was then postponed until June 2012. Due to the project postponement, during 2010 repairs were made to the existing bridge deck, piers, and west abutment. Due to a lack of funding the project was delayed once more until the city announced it would accept bids in late 2012, with Tutor Perini selected as general contractor in February 2013. In 2005 the estimated cost of the project was $50 million. In 2009 the estimate increased to $120 million due to redesigns and the addition of related projects. The final bid came in at $102.7 million.

Some residents, however, opposed the design of the cable-stayed bridge and felt that its tower would be out of character with the low-rise homes on City Island. Opponents of the bridge design filed a lawsuit against the city on November 6, 2013. A Bronx Supreme Court judge granted a temporary injunction on that date. In December 2013 the court lifted the injunction, but ruled that the city must conduct public hearings. The city's prior consultations with the island community, which began during the early design stages, had been informal. The court's ruling requires the city to follow its Uniform Land Use Review Procedure, which includes local Community Board hearings. On May 5, 2014, the original bridge plans were scrapped, and the de Blasio administration chose to go with a slightly cheaper and much shorter causeway-style bridge. The bridge, which was later approved, would be completed by 2017.

A temporary steel bridge was erected in 2015, but a partial collapse in September delayed the opening of the temporary bridge. On December 16, 2015, the New York City Department of Transportation (NYCDOT) conducted a road test on the temporary steel bridge by running heavy equipment including fire trucks over the bridge. The NYCDOT conducted the tests to ease residents' concerns about the integrity of the temporary structure. Two days later on December 18, the original bridge was closed, and traffic was routed to the temporary bridge. Shortly after that, the city began demolishing the original bridge, with the new bridge being constructed on the same site as the 1901 bridge. The new bridge opened on October 29, 2017.
