= City Island, Bronx =

Island and neighborhood in New York City

City Island
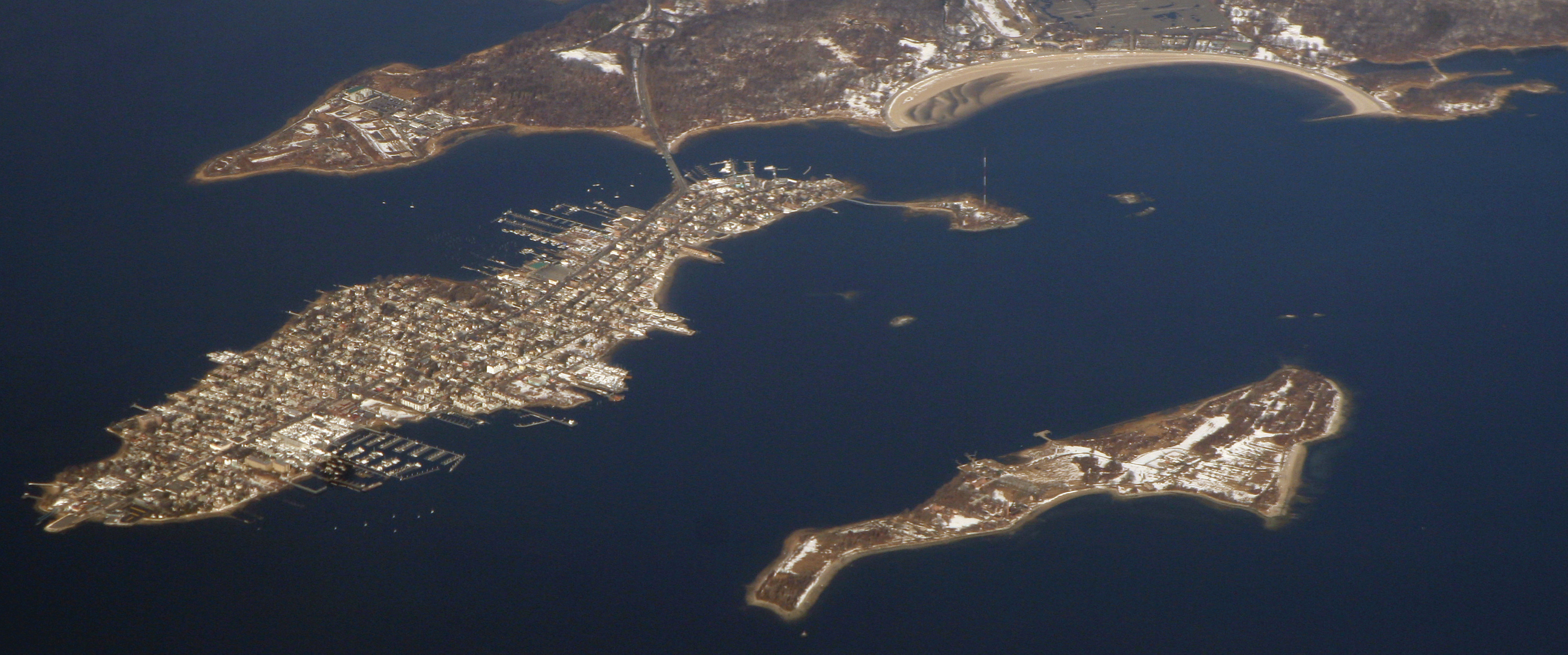
- Aerial view of City Island (left) and Hart Island (right)

Geography
- Location: Long Island Sound
- Coordinates: 40.848°N 73.786°W
- Archipelago: Pelham Islands
- Area: 0.39505 sq mi (1.0232 km^{2})
- Length: 1.5 mi (2.4 km)
- Width: 0.5 mi (0.8 km)

Administration
- United States
- State: New York
- City: New York City
- Borough: The Bronx
- Community District: The Bronx 10

Demographics
- Population: 4,417 (2020)

City Island is a neighborhood in the northeastern Bronx, New York City, located on an island of the same name approximately 1.5 miles (2.4 km) long by 0.5 miles (0.80 km) wide. City Island is located at the extreme western end of Long Island Sound, south of Pelham Bay Park and east of Eastchester Bay.

At one time the island was incorporated within the boundaries of the town of Pelham in Westchester County, New York, but the island has been part of New York City since the late 19th century. City Island is part of the Pelham Islands, a group of islands that once belonged to Thomas Pell. The body of water between City Island and the even smaller, uninhabited Hart Island to the east is known as City Island Harbor. The small island adjacent to the northeast is High Island. The Stepping Stones Light, marking the main shipping channel into New York, is off the southern tip of City Island, near the Long Island shore.

As of the 2020 census, the island had a population of 4,417. Its land area is 0.395 square miles (1.02 km^{2}). The island is part of Bronx Community District 10, and its ZIP Code is 10464.

== History ==
1884 nautical chart

Prior to European colonization, the island now known as City Island was inhabited by Native Americans, possibly the Wiechquaeskeck band of the Lenape people who left shell middens indicating that they had gathered, cooked, and consumed oysters and clams on the island. The island was part of a very large property, about 50,000 acres, to which the English physician Thomas Pell established ownership in a treaty signed by five Lenape sachems in 1654.

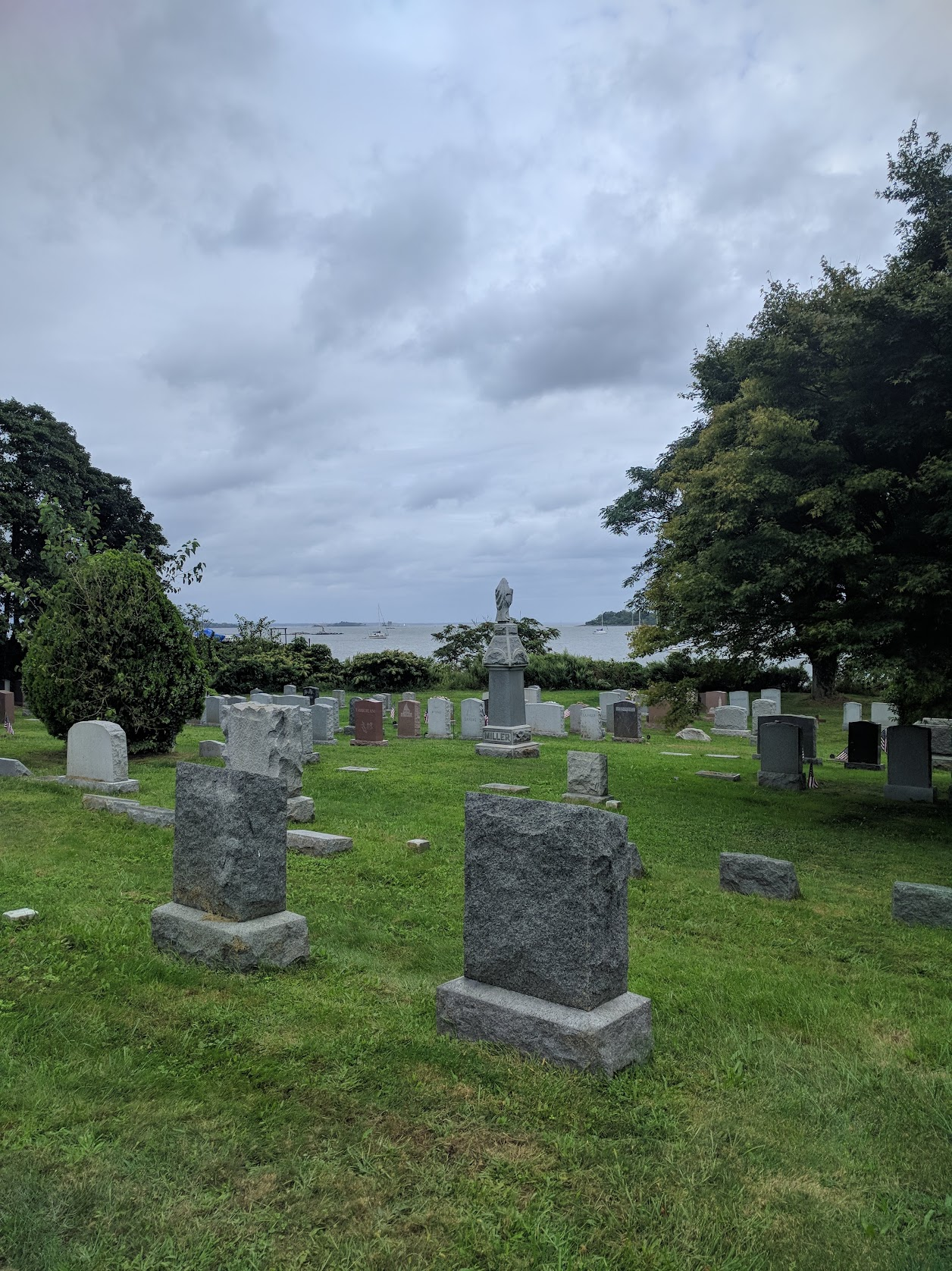
Pelham Cemetery

The island—known by different names including Minnewits, Minneford, Minefer's, Great Mulberry Island—was purchased in 1761 by Benjamin Palmer of New York, who planned to make it a major seaport in western Long Island Sound. Palmer changed the name to New City Island, later dropping the "New."

Up to this point the island had been inhabited by only a few homes and farms. It had a population of about 1000 people, who tended farms and livestock. Palmer had the vision of developing the island into a port, which could rival that of New York. He knew that ships heading north and south passed City Island using Long Island Sound as a safe inshore waterway. He envisioned shipyards, and stores that could cater to the ships. He went as far as to have the island mapped out in different plots designated as shipyards, docks, business, farms, homes, schools, and houses of worship, along with streets, paths, and access routes. Benjamin Palmer appealed to the British Crown and received letters patent that covered the ownership of waterfront properties 400 feet out from the high tide mark under water and around the perimeter of the Island. This patent, known as the "Palmer Grant" is unique to City Island; it has been contested in courts since, but has always been upheld.

Palmer also is responsible for changing the name from Minefer's Island to City Island in anticipation of things to come. Palmer's vision never fully materialized, however, as the timing just before the American Revolution halted all progress, and the war depleted the capital of Palmer and his investors. It would be another sixty years before the island again started to be developed when oystermen, pilots of Hell Gate, a set of nearby narrows, and eventually shipbuilders arrived and introduced these industries.

In 1819, City Island was annexed to the town of Pelham, Westchester County. It narrowly voted to become a part of New York City in 1895, in exchange for a new bridge to the mainland, and was consolidated as part of the Bronx in 1898. The island continued to host harbor defenses through the early 20th century. In the mid-20th century, City Island developed as a shipbuilding community, before becoming a daytrippers' destination. City Island has generally remained sparsely developed with a suburban feel. A 43-unit condo complex called On the Sound, built in 2015, was the first major residential project on the island since around 2000.

According to local tradition, anyone actually born on the island is known as a "clam digger". A City Island resident not born on the island is known as a "mussel sucker".

== Demographics ==
For census purposes, the New York City government classifies City Island as part of a larger neighborhood tabulation area called Pelham Bay-Country Club-City Island. As of the 2020 Census, the island had a population of 4,417.

Based on data from the 2010 United States census, the population of Pelham Bay-Country Club-City Island was 26,583, a decrease of 557 (2.1%) from the 27,140 counted in 2000. Covering an area of 917.45 acres (371.28 ha), the neighborhood had a population density of 29.0 inhabitants per acre (18,600/sq mi; 7,200/km^{2}). The racial makeup of the Pelham Bay-Country Club-City Island neighborhood was 62.0% (16,488) White, 2.9% (773) African American, 0.1% (36) Native American, 3.6% (969) Asian, 0.0% (5) Pacific Islander, 0.4% (110) from other races, and 0.9% (252) from two or more races. Hispanic or Latino of any race were 29.9% (7,950) of the population.

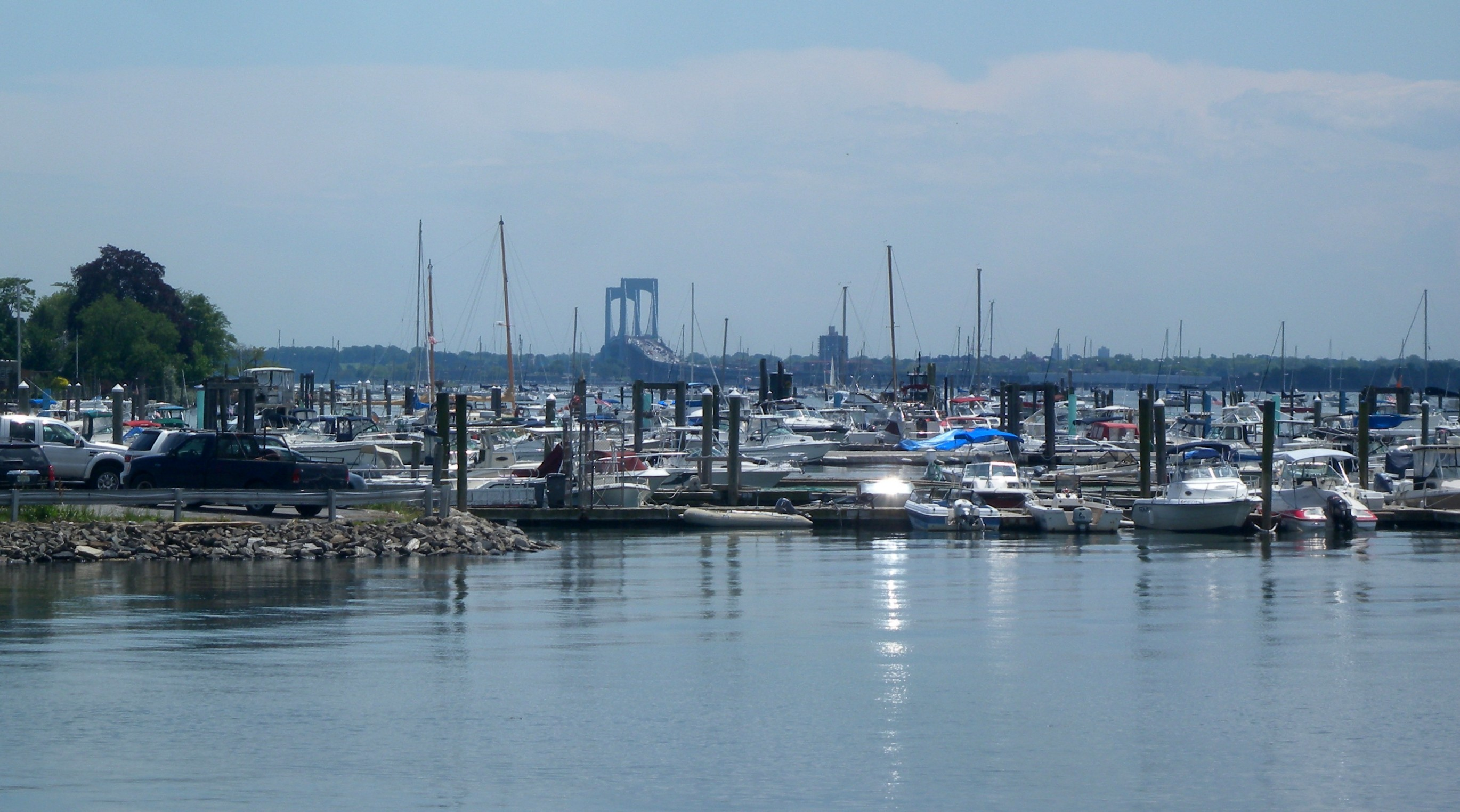
Looking southwest at marina and distant Throgs Neck Bridge

The entirety of Community District 10, which comprises City Island, Co-op City, Country Club, Pelham Bay, Schuylerville, Throgs Neck and Westchester Square, had 121,868 inhabitants as of NYC Health's 2018 Community Health Profile, with an average life expectancy of 81.1 years. This is about the same as the median life expectancy of 81.2 for all New York City neighborhoods. Most inhabitants are youth and middle-aged adults: 20% are between the ages of between 0–17, 26% between 25 and 44, and 27% between 45 and 64. The ratio of college-aged and elderly residents was lower, at 9% and 18% respectively.

As of 2017, the median household income in Community District 10 was $59,522. In 2018, an estimated 14% residents of Community District 10 lived in poverty, compared to 25% in all of the Bronx and 20% in all of New York City. One in eleven residents (9%) were unemployed, compared to 13% in the Bronx and 9% in New York City. Rent burden, or the percentage of residents who have difficulty paying their rent, is 45% in Community District 10, compared to the boroughwide and citywide rates of 58% and 51% respectively. Based on this calculation, as of 2018, Community District 10 is considered high-income relative to the rest of the city and not gentrifying.

== Land use ==
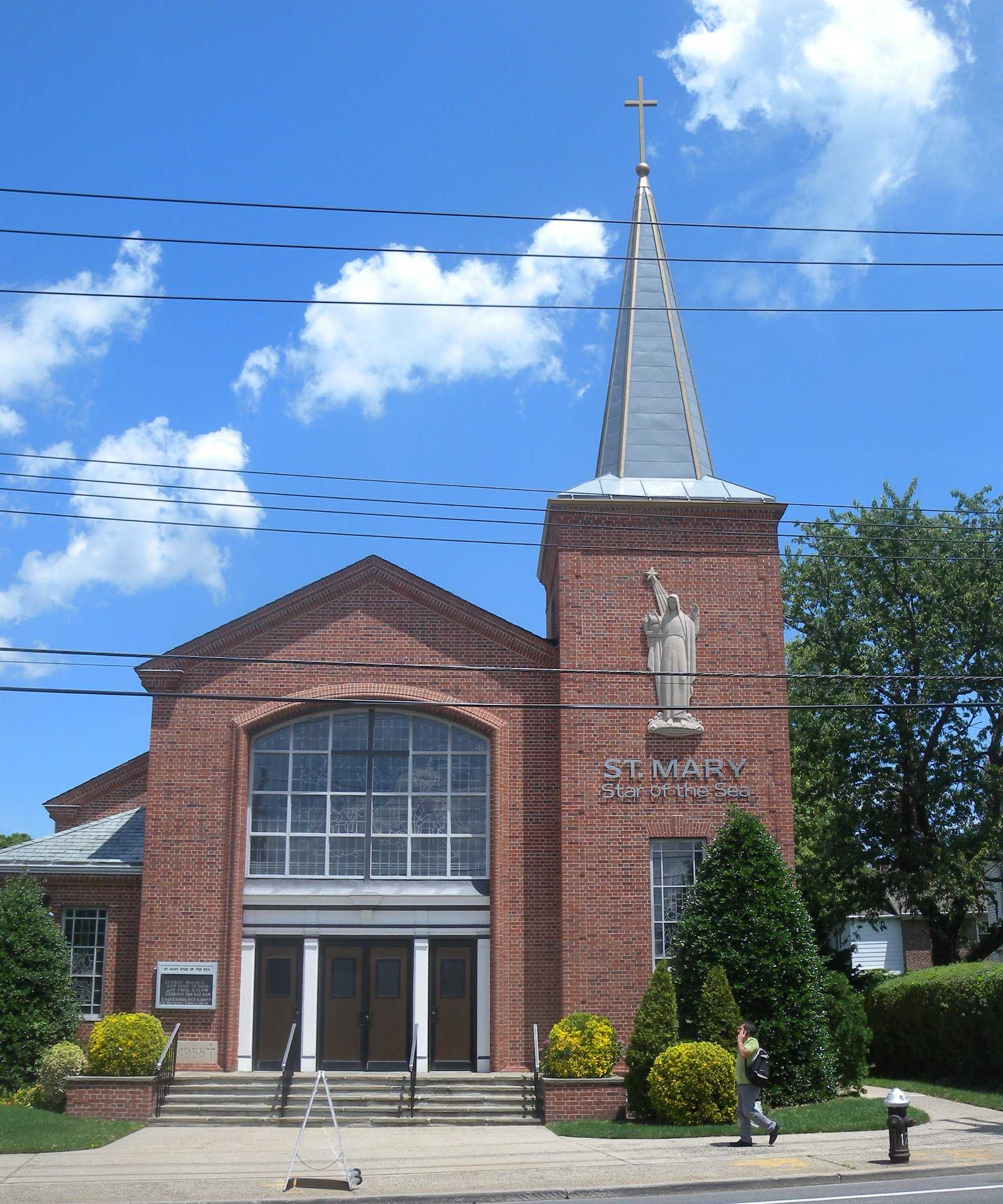
St. Mary Star of the Sea Roman Catholic Church

Most businesses are clustered along the central City Island Avenue. There is one small supermarket, a gas station, a bank, a hardware store and a variety of other small shops. The island is most famous for its numerous seafood restaurants and antique stores, which line both sides of the avenue.

At the southernmost section of City Island is Belden Point, named for William Belden, a developer who opened an amusement park and resort in the area in 1887. In the early part of the 20th century, the area was a favored recreation location for business tycoons including Vincent Astor, J.P. Morgan and William Randolph Hearst. Today, Belden Point is home to a number of popular seafood restaurants. A new public greenspace was dedicated in 2016 at its waterfront tip.

In 1960 City Island became the last community in New York City to get dial telephone service. Until then eight operators in a private home on Schofield Street connected all calls. The dial exchange began as Area Code 212-TT5. Now Area Code 718–885.

=== Geology ===
City Island was created by glacial deposits at the end of the last ice age. There is a layer of bedrock and then a thick layer of red clay topped with sand, with topsoil above that. The southern end has deposits of rare blue clay. The area is strewn with glacial erratic boulders. Local bedrock is Manhattan schist with glacial striations.

=== Endemic wildlife ===
The forms of animal life on the island are not much different from that of the surrounding region, and are typical of a suburban environment: raccoons, squirrels, rabbits, skunk, and occasional deer. Coyotes and turkeys have also been sighted.

The real diversity of wildlife on and around City Island is among birds, especially aquatic species. There are many varieties of duck; buffleheads, goldeneyes, mallards, and cormorants. Canada geese are common, as are mute swans, great blue herons, great white egrets, and several types of gull. A small protected wetlands area on west Ditmars Street is home to many of these species as well as the feral pigeon.

Bright green parrots (monk parakeets), originally imported from South America as pets, have adapted to the climate and breed in the wild in New York. They are a common sight on City Island and in nearby Pelham Bay Park. Rafters of wild turkeys also are often seen in the park. Deer are occasionally seen on the island, although more commonly in Pelham Bay Park. Another, nonnative species of the island is the brown or De Kay's snake, which has adapted to life among the island's growing community.

== Activities ==
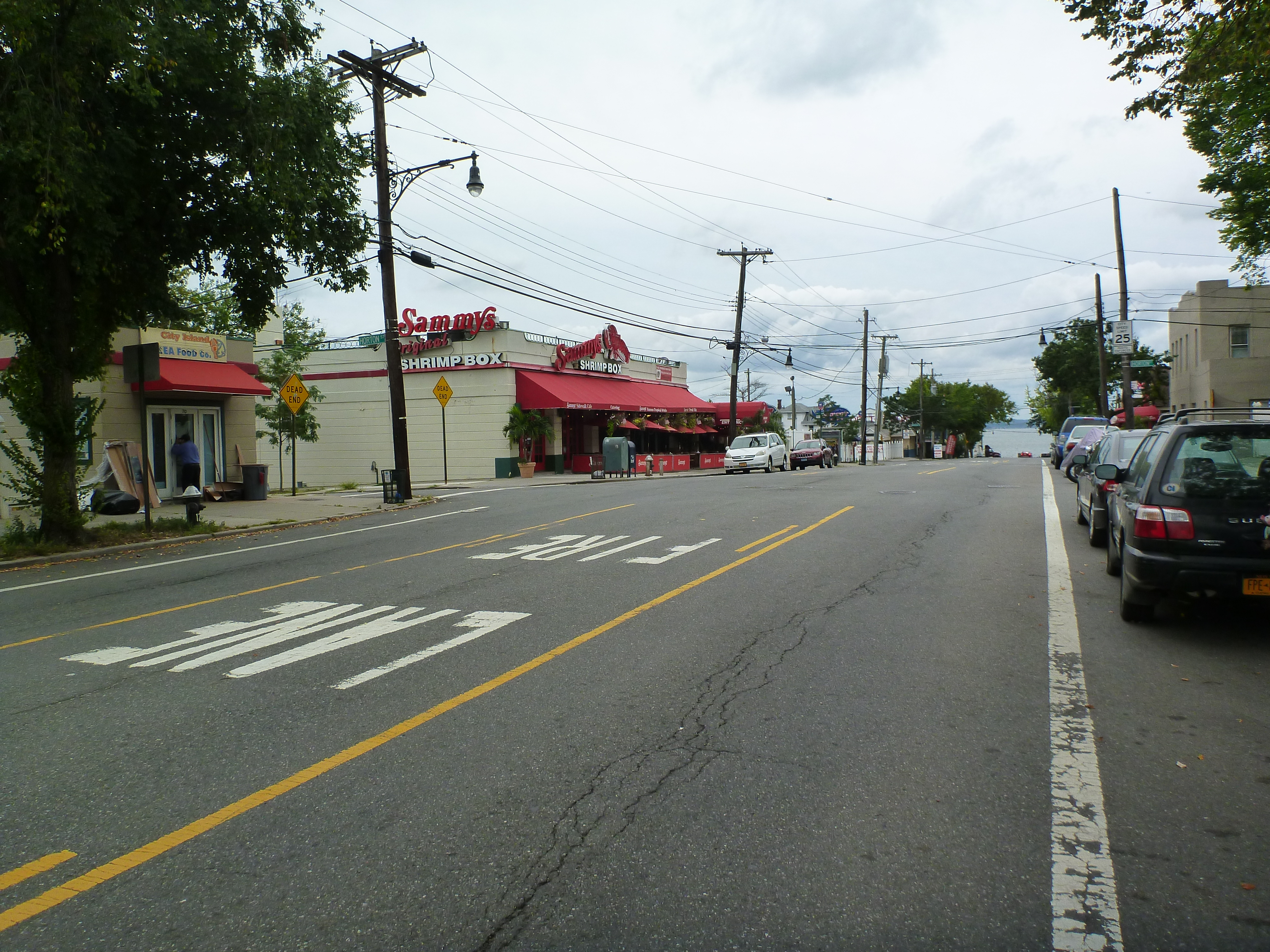
Fish restaurants on City Island Avenue

=== Local points of interest ===
The island is famous for its seafood restaurants; lobster is a popular specialty. While a few of the restaurants close during the winter months, most are open year-round.

The City Island Nautical Museum displays maritime artifacts and antiques. It is located at 190 Fordham Street and is open only on Saturday and Sunday afternoons (other times by appointment). Admission is eight dollars, and there is a small gift shop. The museum is located in the PS17 building, a historic school building built in 1897 before the City Island Bridge.

The island has landmarks, such as the Samuel Pell Mansion on City Island Avenue, near St. Mary Star of the Sea Church. It is where Arsenic and Old Lace was filmed for TV in 1969. There are a number of old Victorian mansions located throughout City Island, mostly on the Sound side, complete with tall pointy spires and gables with gazebos, such as Delmours Point on Tier Street.

The City Island Theater Group, a local community theater established in 1999, produces shows year round.

=== Boating ===
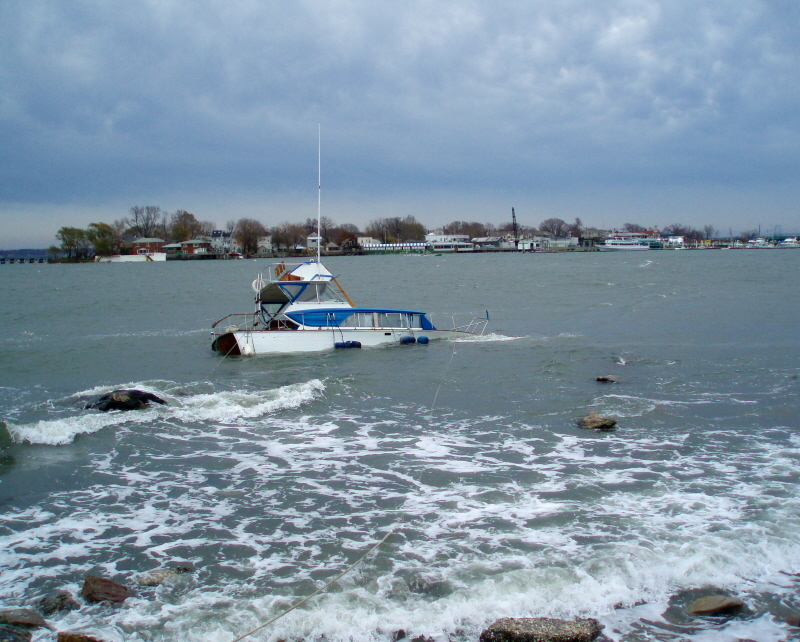
City Island as seen from Orchard Beach in the winter of 2007. An abandoned boat is visible in the foreground; such boats sometimes wash up around City Island and Pelham Bay.

The island has three yacht clubs situated on the Eastchester Bay side of the island. They are, from north to south, the Harlem Yacht Club, the City Island Yacht Club, and the Morris Yacht and Beach Club. The Touring Kayak Club is on the west side of the island. Barron's Boatyard, the North Minneford Yacht Club and the South Minneford Yacht Club are on the east side of the island. There are two active sail lofts (UK-Halsey and Doyle). The island also has several commercial marinas.

The island has what are called "special anchorages" where boats of all sizes are freely moored or anchored, and there are many docks with boat slips for mooring boats in a secure and restricted way. There are also many large piers around the island that can receive large ships.

The island is home to the Columbia University Sailing Team, whose fleet of dinghies is docked at City Island Yacht Club. The team comes from Manhattan four times a week to practice off the western shore of City Island. Fordham University's Sailing Team sails out of Morris Yacht and Beach Club. Many of the boats which competed and won in the America's Cup in years past were built in the Nevins Boat Yard on City Island. The Eastchester Bay Yacht Racing Association is the major organizer for sailboat races in the area.

A small fleet of head boats takes paying passengers on fishing trips to Long Island Sound. Smaller boats are also available for rent by the day. The sail and power boating industry has been declining in recent years, as boatyards are being sold and being converted into condominiums. Abandoned boats sometimes wash up around City Island and Pelham Bay, in part due to the high cost of maintaining a boat.

== Local organizations ==
- City Island Civic Association
- American Legion – Leonard H. Hawkins Post 156
- Cub Scouts Pack 211
- Boy Scouts Troop 211
- City Island Nautical Museum
- Garden Club of City Island
- AARP 318
- U.S. Coast Guard Auxiliary Flotilla 014-05-04 City Island
- U.S. Power Squadron City Island
- City Island Republicans
- American Legion Auxiliary Post 156
- City Island Rising
- City Island Little League
- Bronx Masonic District
- City Island Indivisible
- City Island Oyster Reef, Inc

== The Island Current ==
The Island Current is a local newspaper printed monthly. The first issue was printed in October 1971, and the newspaper focuses on local issues, gatherings and businesses, as well as boating information. The newspaper maintains a close relationship with the City Island Chamber of Commerce.

== Police and crime ==
City Island is patrolled by the 45th Precinct of the NYPD, located at 2877 Barkley Avenue in Throggs Neck. The 45th Precinct ranked 28th safest out of 69 patrol areas for per-capita crime in 2010. As of 2018, with a non-fatal assault rate of 53 per 100,000 people, Community District 10's rate of violent crimes per capita was less than that of the city as a whole. The incarceration rate of 243 per 100,000 people was lower than that of the city as a whole.

The 45th Precinct has a lower crime rate than in the 1990s, with crimes across all categories having decreased by 67% between 1990 and 2022. The precinct reported five murders, 13 rapes, 235 robberies, 265 felony assaults, 108 burglaries, 609 grand larcenies, and 323 grand larcenies auto in 2022.

== Fire safety ==
City Island is served by the New York City Fire Department (FDNY)'s Engine Co. 70/Ladder Co. 53, located at 169 Schofield Street.

== Health ==
As of 2018, preterm births are more common in Community District 10, which comprises City Island, Co-op City, Country Club, Pelham Bay, Schuylerville, Throgs Neck and Westchester Square, compared to other places citywide, although births to teenage mothers are less common. In Community District 10, there were 110 preterm births per 1,000 live births (compared to 87 per 1,000 citywide), and 10.3 births to teenage mothers per 1,000 live births (compared to 19.3 per 1,000 citywide). Community District 10 has a low population of residents who are uninsured. In 2018, this population of uninsured residents was estimated to be 7%, lower than the citywide rate of 14%, though this was based on a small sample size.

The concentration of fine particulate matter, the deadliest type of air pollutant, in Community District 10 is 0.0075 milligrams per cubic metre (7.5×10^{−9} oz/ft^{3}), the same as the city average. Fourteen percent of Community District 10 residents are smokers, which is the same as the city average of 14% of residents being smokers. In Community District 10, 24% of residents are obese, 13% are diabetic, and 37% have high blood pressure—compared to the citywide averages of 24%, 11%, and 28% respectively. In addition, 25% of children are obese, compared to the citywide average of 20%.

Eighty-seven percent of residents eat some fruits and vegetables every day, which is the same as the city's average of 87%. In 2018, 77% of residents described their health as "good", "very good", or "excellent", about the same as the city's average of 78%. For every supermarket in Community District 10, there are seven bodegas.

The nearest large hospitals are Calvary Hospital, Montefiore Medical Center's Jack D. Weiler Hospital, and Jacobi Medical Center in Morris Park. The Albert Einstein College of Medicine campus is also located in Morris Park.

== Post office and ZIP Code ==
City Island is located within ZIP Code 10464. The United States Postal Service operates the City Island Station post office at 199 City Island Avenue.

== Education ==
Community District 10, which comprises City Island, Co-op City, Country Club, Pelham Bay, Schuylerville, Throgs Neck and Westchester Square, generally has a lower rate of college-educated residents than the rest of the city as of 2018. While 34% of residents age 25 and older have a college education or higher, 16% have less than a high school education and 50% are high school graduates or have some college education. By contrast, 26% of Bronx residents and 43% of city residents have a college education or higher. The percentage of Community District 10 students excelling in math rose from 29% in 2000 to 47% in 2011, and reading achievement increased from 33% to 35% during the same time period.

Community District 10's rate of elementary school student absenteeism is slightly higher than the rest of New York City. In Community District 10, 21% of elementary school students missed twenty or more days per school year, a little more than the citywide average of 20%. Additionally, 75% of high school students in Community District 10 graduate on time, the same as the citywide average of 75%.

=== Schools ===
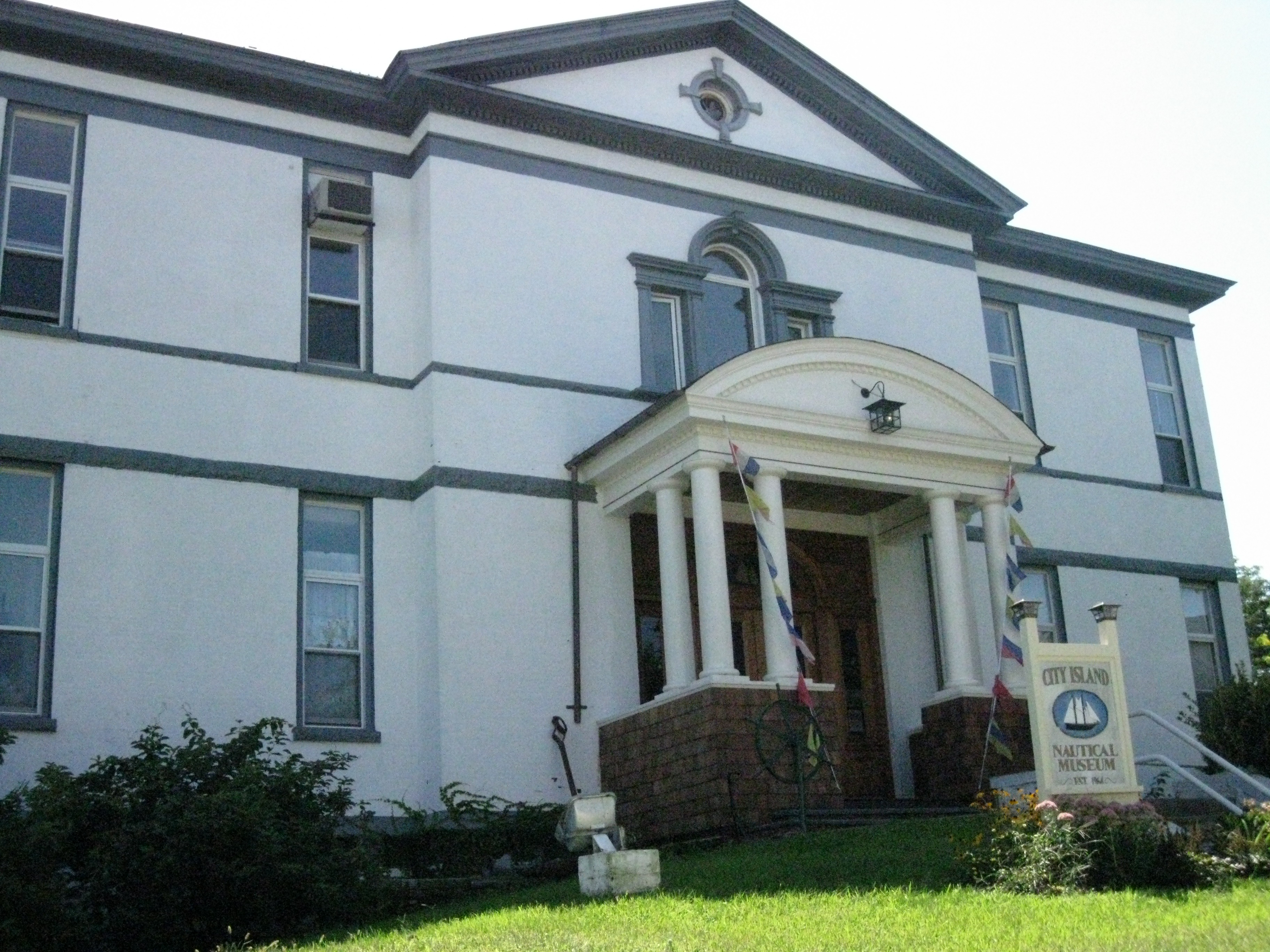
The former Public School 17, now the City Island Nautical Museum

The public school on City Island is operated by the New York City Department of Education. PS 175, located on City Island Avenue, serves grades K-8 for the island.

The School of St. Mary Star of the Sea was a Roman Catholic grade school, serving grades PreK-8 on City Island, until it closed in the end of the 2012–2013 school year. The church operated Holy Rosary Early Childhood Academy at St. Mary Star Of The Sea until its closure in 2010.

The former Public School 17 houses the City Island Historical Society and Nautical Museum. It was listed on the National Register of Historic Places in 1984.

=== Library ===
The New York Public Library (NYPL)'s City Island branch is located at 320 City Island Avenue. The branch has been operating since 1903, but moved to its current building in 1970; a renovation in 1997 doubled the size of the branch. The City Island branch contains a "ship collection" of over a thousand ship-related media, as well as a collection of materials about City Island's history.

== Religion ==
The religious communities on the island are relatively diverse for its size. There are four houses of worship: Saint Mary Star of the Sea Holy Roman Catholic Church, Trinity United Methodist Church, Grace Episcopal Church, and Temple Beth El (founded in 1934), a non-denominational liberal synagogue.

== Transportation ==
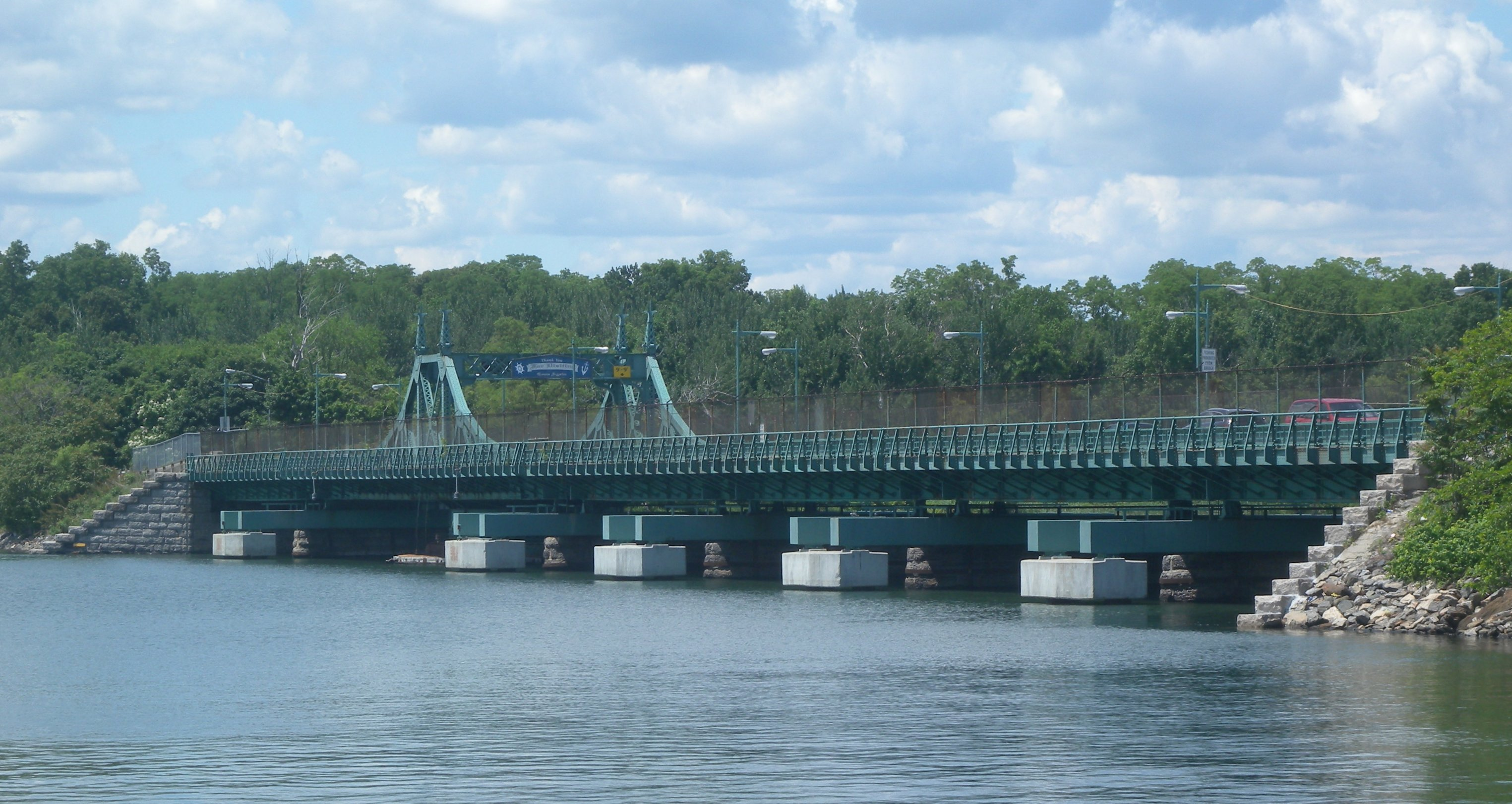
Old City Island Bridge (now demolished)

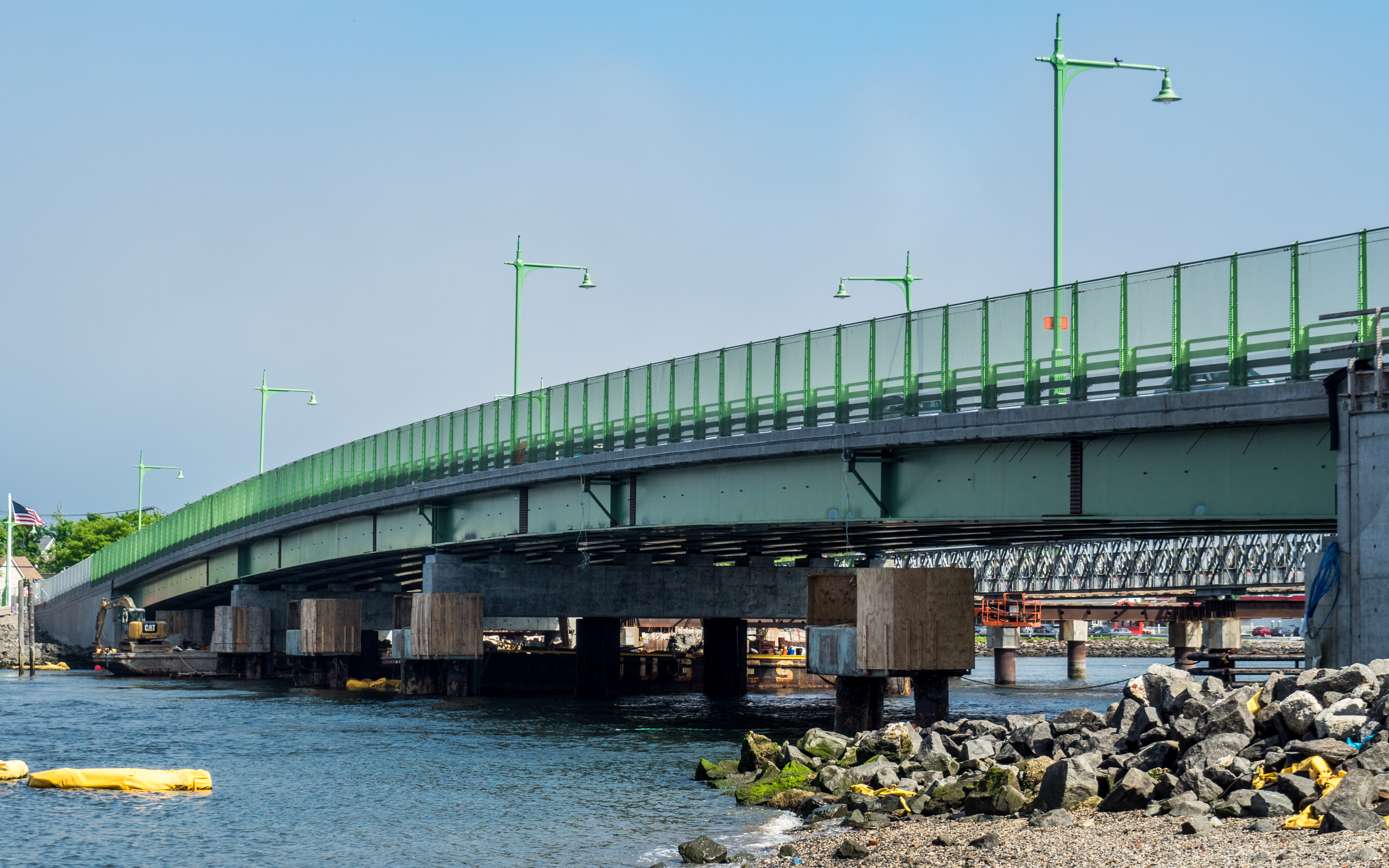
New City Island Causeway Bridge

Starting in 1760, a small rope ferry ran between the mainland and City Island. In 1873 a bridge was built by a syndicate of City Island businessmen, including G.W. Horton, Ben Hedgeman, and David Carll. It was replaced by 950-foot (290 m) steel, three-lane City Island Bridge in 1901. In 2014, the New York City Department of Transportation had proposed replacing it with a cable-stayed bridge hanging from a 160-foot tower but the design faced intense community opposition and the city submitted a redesign which was approved. A temporary bridge was used from December 2015 until October 2017 which allowed for the demolition of the old bridge and the construction of its replacement. The New City Island Causeway Bridge opened to traffic on October 29, 2017.

There is another small, private bridge on the northeastern end of City Island connecting it to High Island, site of the radio transmitter for WFAN (660 AM) and WCBS (880 AM). A security gate prevents public access.

The Pelham Park & City Island Railway connected City Island to Pelham Bay Park from 1887 to 1919. Originally composed of two separate railroads, the 3 ft 6 in (1,067 mm) narrow-gauge horsecar route was operated by the Pelham Park Railroad Company, which ran service between the Bartow station of the Harlem River & Port Chester Railroad and Brown's Hotel on City Island. The 3.2-mile (5.1 km) route was complete by 1892. The Interborough Rapid Transit Company, which operated part of the modern-day New York City Subway, absorbed the two companies in 1902 and started designing its own monorail in 1908. The monorail's first journey in July 1910 ended with the monorail toppling on its side. Although service resumed in November 1910, the monorail went into receivership in December 1911, and the monorail ceased operation on April 3, 1914. In July 1914, the IRT sold the company to the Third Avenue Railway, which ceased operation of the City Island Railroad on August 9, 1919.

As of 2024, the only public transportation to City Island consists of two bus routes operated by the Metropolitan Transportation Authority. The island is served by MTA Regional Bus Operations's Bx29 local route, which operates to the New York City Subway's Pelham Bay Park station, and two rush-hour extended round-trips of the BxM8 express route, which runs to Manhattan.

The Bronx Tourism Council ran the City Island Seaside Trolley, which later became a ferry service. This ferry service was retired in 2020. In the 2020s, residents of City Island have advocated for a NYC Ferry stop in the neighborhood, although NYC Ferry had no plans to expand there. Supporters of the NYC Ferry proposal said that additional ferry service would alleviate traffic to and from the neighborhood, though a 2019 feasibility study found that a ferry route to City Island would have few riders.

== In popular culture ==
=== Films ===
- A very early film shot in a City Island studio was Richard III (1912), the oldest surviving American feature-length film.
- Butterfield 8 (1960), starring Elizabeth Taylor, who won an Oscar for this role.
- Long Day's Journey into Night (1962), directed by Sidney Lumet; starring Katharine Hepburn and Jason Robards Jr.
- Awakenings (1990), directed by Penny Marshall; starring Robert De Niro and Robin Williams
- A Bronx Tale (1993), with Chazz Palminteri and De Niro (making his directorial debut as well), which featured the City Island Bridge and one scene filmed in the parking lot of Johnny's Reef Restaurant.
- Love Is All There Is (1996), with Lainie Kazan and Angelina Jolie
- Don't Say a Word (2001), starring Michael Douglas and Brittany Murphy, filmed at the Hart Island Ferry and Hart Island.
- Wes Anderson's The Royal Tenenbaums (2001) was filmed at Delmours Point, which is the mansion where Long Days Journey into Night was filmed.
- The Groomsmen (2006), directed by Edward Burns, was filmed at many locations on City Island.
- Louis Lombardi shot many scenes in Dough Boys (2008) on the island.
- Margot at the Wedding (2007); written and directed by Noah Baumbach, and starring Nicole Kidman. It was filmed on City Island Avenue and other locations on the island.
- City Island (2009)—a comedy-drama starring Andy García, Julianna Margulies, and Steven Strait as members of a dysfunctional family living on City Island—was shot on location and set there for the majority of the film's plot. The film won the Audience Favorite Award at the 2009 Tribeca Film Festival.
- Douglas returned to City Island with actor Danny DeVito to film Solitary Man (2009) in the City Island Diner.
- Jessica Alba co-starred in An Invisible Sign of My Own (2009) there.
- The documentary film Weiner (2016) includes a scene at a meeting of Democratic party voters on City Island.

=== Literature ===
- James Gregory Kingston's novel, The City Island Messenger, uses City Island as the backdrop for a story about a young boy delivering Western Union telegrams that break the sad news of soldiers' deaths to families, over a span of a week during World War II, during the Battle of Midway
- In Kurt Vonnegut's novel Bluebeard, the character Dan Gregory states that his 80-foot (24 m) yacht, the Ararat, was dry-docked on City Island
- William Fisher's 1952 novel, The Waiters, is about African American workers at an enormous seafood restaurant on City Island.
- In Holly Black's Ironside, Kaye and Corny go to City Island as a means to get to Hart Island.
- Part of Benjamin Hale's 2011 novel The Evolution of Bruno Littlemore sees the titular chimpanzee briefly live on City Island.

=== Television ===
Numerous television shows have featured or been shot on City Island. For example:

- Car 54, Where Are You?
- Comedian Jerry Seinfeld visited City Island Diner on the island with Ricky Gervais in one of the webisodes of his Comedians in Cars Getting Coffee
- Coronet Blue
- The Law & Order episode "Maritime" showed the City Island bridge.
- The Law & Order: Criminal Intent episode "Sound Bodies", which was based on a real-life story of several local teenagers who drowned in Long Island Sound near City Island.
- The Law & Order: Special Victims Unit episode "Melancholy Pursuit" partially takes place on City Island.
- The fictional city of Hyde in the series finale of the US version of Life on Mars was filmed on City Island.
- The Amazon series Sneaky Pete filmed on City Island during season 1.
- Episode 0946 of Sesame Street, which aired in 1976.

=== Production company ===
Since 2002, the film production company Harrington Talents has had its offices and studio located on City Island. Notable celebrities who have worked on their productions include rapper and actor Ice-T, and professional wrestler Bruno Sammartino.

== Notable residents ==
Notable current and former residents of the island include:

- Anthony Amato (1920–2011) and Sally Amato (1917–2000), founders and former directors of Amato Opera.
- Harry Carey (1878–1947), one of silent film's earliest superstars.
- Adolfo Carrión Jr. (born 1961), former Bronx Borough President.
- Clinton Leupp (born 1965), drag performer, better known by his drag persona Coco Peru and actor (films To Wong Foo, Thanks for Everything! Julie Newmar and Trick).
- Bruce McRae (1867–1927), stage and silent film actor.
- George Meany (1894–1980), union leader who served as president of the AFL–CIO.
- Henry B. Nevins (1878–1959), master yacht builder.
- Vincent Pastore (1946–2026), actor known for his portrayal of Salvatore "Big Pussy" Bonpensiero on the TV series The Sopranos.
- Carlos D. Ramirez (1946–1999), publisher of El Diario La Prensa.
- Red Buttons (1919–2006), comedian-actor who got his start at Ryan's Inn wearing a bellhop uniform with large red buttons.
- Oliver Sacks (1933–2015), who wrote the book Awakenings, whose adaptation was filmed at a house similar to his own, but on a different street on the island. He would routinely swim around the entire island, or swim vast distances away from the island and back.
- Eric W. Sanderson, conservation ecologist and author.
- Salvatore Santoro (1913–2000), Lucchese crime family underboss.
- Frank Scalice (1893–1957), Italian-American mobster who led the future Gambino crime family from 1930 to 1931, and was underboss from 1951 to 1957.
- Richard Waring (1911–1994), television and film actor.

== See also ==
- Cuban Ledge
- Execution Rocks Lighthouse
- Fort Slocum
- Green Flats Reef
- Hart Island
- Pelham Islands
