= USS Josephine (SP-1243) =

Patrol vessel of the United States Navy

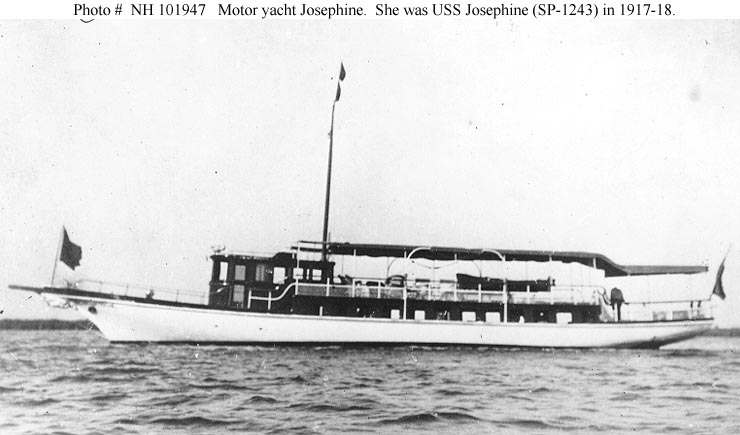
- Josephine as a civilian yacht sometime between 1905 and 1917, prior to her U.S. Navy service.

History

United States
- Name: USS Josephine
- Namesake: Previous name retained
- Builder: Peter Grutti Shipyards, New Orleans, Louisiana
- Completed: 1905
- Acquired: 27 October 1917
- Commissioned: 5 November 1917
- Decommissioned: 6 December 1918
- Fate: Returned to owners
- Notes: Operated as civilian yacht Josephine 1905-1917 and from December 1918

General characteristics
- Type: Patrol vessel
- Tonnage: 32 tons
- Length: 82 ft (25 m)
- Beam: 12 ft 10 in (3.91 m)
- Draft: 4 ft 6 in (1.37 m)
- Propulsion: Diesel engine
- Speed: 12 knots
- Armament: 1 × 3-pounder gun; 1 × 1-pounder gun

The second USS Josephine (SP-1243) was a United States Navy patrol vessel in commission from 1917 to 1918.

Josephine was built as a civilian motor yacht of the same name in 1905 by the Peter Grutti Shipyards at New Orleans, Louisiana. The U.S. Navy acquired her at New Orleans from her owners, Lee H. Tate et al. of St. Louis, Missouri, on 27 October 1917 for World War I service as a patrol vessel. She was commissioned as USS Josephine (SP-1243) on 5 November 1917.

Attached to the 8th Naval District and based at Burrwood, Louisiana, Josephine patrolled the Southwest Pass, the lower Mississippi River, and the Gulf of Mexico on the section patrol for the remainder of World War I.

Josephine was decommissioned on 6 December 1918 and was returned to Tate and his co-owners.

Josephine should not be confused with two other patrol vessels, USS Josephine (SP-913) and USS Josephine (SP-3295), which also were in commission in the U.S. Navy during World War I.
