= Hok Yau Club =

Hong Kong non-profit organization

- 學友社
- Formation: April 1949
- Headquarters: 12/F, Cheung Lee Building, 141 Cheung Sha Wan Road, Sham Shui Po, Kowloon, Hong Kong
- Chairman: Chan Wing-man (陳穎文)
- Co-president: Ng Tak-kay (伍德基)
- Co-president: Tse Kim-ming (謝劍明)
- Website: hyc.org.hk
- Formerly called: Hok Yau Dancing Club

Hok Yau Club
- Traditional Chinese: 學友社
Transcriptions
Yue: Cantonese
- Yale Romanization: Hohk yáuh séh
- Jyutping: Hok6 jau5 se5

Hok Yau Club is an independent and non-profit non-governmental organisation (NGO) in Hong Kong. It is a peripheral organisation of the Chinese Communist Party.

Its aim is to provide support and guidance to students as well as to organise activities for youths. Since the transfer of sovereignty over Hong Kong back to the People's Republic of China in 1997, the club has launched a number of civic projects to promote patriotic education to the younger generation. The motto of the club is "To Learn and To Serve" (「探求真知，服務社會」).

The club has three venues: Head Office in Sham Shui Po, Kowloon, which also serves as the club's Kowloon Centre, Island Centre in North Point, Hong Kong Island, and a Student Guidance Centre in Cheung Sha Wan, Kowloon.

== History ==
It was founded as "Hok Yau Dancing Club" (學友中西舞蹈研究社) in April 1949. After a prolonged discussion among the members of a readers club of the Wah Kiu Yat Po (華僑日報), a popular Hong Kong newspaper at the time, it adopted the current name in 1975 to reflect the changing nature of the organisation.

== Organisation ==
=== Annual General Meeting ===
The Annual general meeting (AGM) is the titular governing body of the club. It consists of all qualified Voting members with annual membership subscription. The AGM must take place at least once a year. Its function includes scrutinising the performance of the Standing Committee and the financial report of the club. The appointment of Honorary presidents of the Club must be ratified in the AGM.

The AGM is also the electoral body of the Standing Committee and each qualified Voting member is entitled to cast his vote in the election.

=== Standing Committee ===
==== Power ====
The Standing Committee is the governing body of the club while the AGM is not sitting.

==== Formation ====
The club's constitution limits the number of the committee should consist of six members, but no more than nine. Qualified voting members are eligible to vote and stand for the Standing Committee election.

The 2005–2007 Standing Committee is the current Standing Committee of Hok Yau Club. The six-member Committee was chosen in the AGM held on 27 November 2005.

== Membership ==
According to the club's constitution, membership of the Club consists of three types:

=== Voting Member ===
An ordinary member can become a voting member of the club, has he been able to show his continuous participation of the club's activities for two years. His application must be recommended and countersigned by two others qualified voting members, and is subject to the approval of the Standing Committee of the club. In recent years, there have been changes of the procedure that applicants are required to attend seminars on the club's history. It is seen as necessary, as the voting members are the electors of the Standing Committee, the governing body of the club. They are entitled to vote in Annual General Meetings (AGMs) and to nominate and be nominated in a Standing Committee election.
The membership fee is the same as that of an ordinary member.

=== Life Member ===
A voting member with a traceable record of ten years' participation in the club, with the recommendation of other voting members, can apply for a life membership with a one-off fee of HK$500. A life member shall enjoy all rights given to a voting member, except the voting right of in Annual General Meetings and Standing Committee elections.

==== Proposed Changes on Life membership ====
A proposal of amendment to the club's Constitution regarding the Lift Membership has been discussed in recent months. The last Standing Committee announced the proposal in early Summer 2005 and consultation was held. The amendment will allow life members of the club to vote in AGMs and to stand for the Standing Committee election held every two years. The then Standing Committee argued that the amendment would allow wider participation in the club's development and promote long-term commitment to the club. There were concerns that the changes would result in long-term domination on the club's administration by a small group of Club members. The amendment proposal is expected to be introduced in the next AGM in November 2006.

=== Membership Number Allocation ===
Ordinary membership number is renewed every year. The formation of the number is according to the date and venue of the membership registration. Each centre is represented by an alphabet, whereas Head Office (Kowloon Centre) is K, Island Centre is H and SGC is W. Then it comes with the month and year of the registration, and the order of registration. For example, if somebody is the first person applies for the membership in December 2006 at Head Office, then the number issued to him will be K0612001. The next one will be K0612002, and so on.
Therefore, upon the annual renewal of the membership, a new number will be issued, and the previous one will no longer be in use.

For voting membership, the alphabets assigned, and the formation are different. Head Office is assigned as A, while Island Centre is B and SGC is C. The annual renewal of membership has no effect on the number. Each voting member is given a designated member number. He can retain the number for life (with annual renewal of membership).

A life member is identified as P, regardless of his location, and a designated number is assigned to him for life.

== Relationship to the Chinese Communist Party ==
The club is an underground branch of the Chinese Communist Party in Hong Kong. It was reportedly one of the chief organisers of the Hong Kong 1967 riots and organised over 100,000 student demonstrators. One of the club's venues was, and still is, located in Kiu Kwan Mansion, North Point, serving as the command centre and arms/weapon storage at the time of the riots.

Florence Leung Mo-han, Hok Yau Club president from 1962 to 1974, was a Communist Party member. She has since immigrated to Canada and published Chinese-language memoirs in 2012 titled My Time in Hong Kong's Underground Communist Party. She admitted that the club operated under the guidance of the CCP and served to recruit young people. She later stated, "Their futures are ruined. That was the biggest mistake of my life which I regret the most." For this, Leung was subsequently denounced by pro-Beijing newspaper Ta Kung Pao.

In 1975 the Hong Kong Standard described the Hok Yau Club as "pro-Peking" and "Maoist".

In his book "Song of the Azalea: Memoir of a Chinese son", Kenneth Ore(柯其毅), one of the club's former members (so as he has claimed), has described himself as "underground recruiter" and uncovered his participation to the underground activities of the Chinese Communist Party in Hong Kong through the club in the 1960s and 1970s, such as bribery, money laundering, arms trafficking, and support of terrorism..

Just before the handover of Hong Kong, the club was once again openly accused as an underground branch of the Chinese Communist Party and under the control of the Party's Hong Kong and Macau Working Committee (中國共產黨港澳工作委員會). The Club officially denied this relationship in its newsletter in March 1997. Several media reports also have come into light regarding the relationship between the club and the underground Communist activities.

== Honorary Patron ==
The Honorary Patron of the club is Regina Leung, wife of Chief Executive Leung Chun-ying. Former Honorary Patrons include Selina Tsang, wife of former Chief Executive Donald Tsang, and Betty Tung Hung-ping, wife of then Chief Executive Tung Chee-hwa, who resigned after her husband had stepped down from power in 2005.
