= Ernest Ferlita =

American dramatist

Father Ernest Ferlita (December 1, 1927 – February 4, 2015) was a Jesuit professor emeritus of drama and speech at Loyola University in New Orleans, Louisiana and a member of the Dramatists Guild. He received his degree in playwriting and dramatic literature at the Yale School of Drama. He was born, the son of a Sicilian immigrant father, in Tampa, Florida.

== Plays ==
His first play, The Ballad of John Ogilvie, was produced Off-Broadway in 1968. In 1978, his Black Medea was staged at the first Spoleto Festival USA in Charleston, South Carolina. It was given three Off-Off Broadway productions as produced at the Actor's Outlet Theatre under the direction of Ken Lowstetter, and won four awards at the 15th Annual AUDELCO Black Theatre Festival.

Another play, The Truth of the Matter, won The Miller Award in the 1986 Deep South Writers Conference. Two other plays by Fr. Ferlita have been produced Off-Off Broadway at the Actor's Outlet Theatre under the direction of Ken Lowstetter: The Obelisk, and Two Cities, a double bill of two one-act plays The Mask of Hiroshima (published in Best Short Plays 1989) and The Bells of Nagasaki.

His one-act play The Witness was one of the winners of the 1999-2000 Love Creek One-Act Play Festival, and his first ten-minute play Come Home, Come Home was chosen to be a part of Love Creek Productions Autumn One Acts 2003.

In 2004 Big Tom was one of ten winners in Catholic University's One-Act Religious Play Competition. His play Ma-Fa, based on the life of Johann Adam Schall von Bell, a Jesuit astronomer in China, was awarded the second prize of the International Competition of Religious Drama for the Great Jubilee in the Year 2000.

== Books ==
He was also the author of several books, including The Theatre of Pilgrimage, The Uttermost Mark, a book on the dramatic writings of the Jesuit poet Gerard Manley Hopkins, and The Paths of Life, three books of reflections on readings for the Sunday Mass. Many of these reflections were given as homilies to the congregation at St. Clare's Monastery in New Orleans, where he served as chaplain until the city's evacuation during Hurricane Katrina in 2005 and where he later continued to serve as chaplain after the hurricane recovery.

Fr. Ferlita was also a librettist for two operas, Dear Ignatius, Dear Isabel and Edith Stein, and was a co-author of The Parables of Lina Wertmuller. He lived the remainder of his life at the Jesuit seminary at St. Charles College in Grand Coteau, Louisiana.

== Related links ==
- COMPANIONS, A play by Fr. Ferlita
- John Ogilvie (1579-1615)
- Fr. Ernest Ferlita bids good-bye to Loyola but not to writing and directing
- Jesuit Playwright, Author, Drama Teacher Dies
