= Amato Opera =

Opera company in New York City

Coordinates: 40°43′31.2″N 73°59′31″W

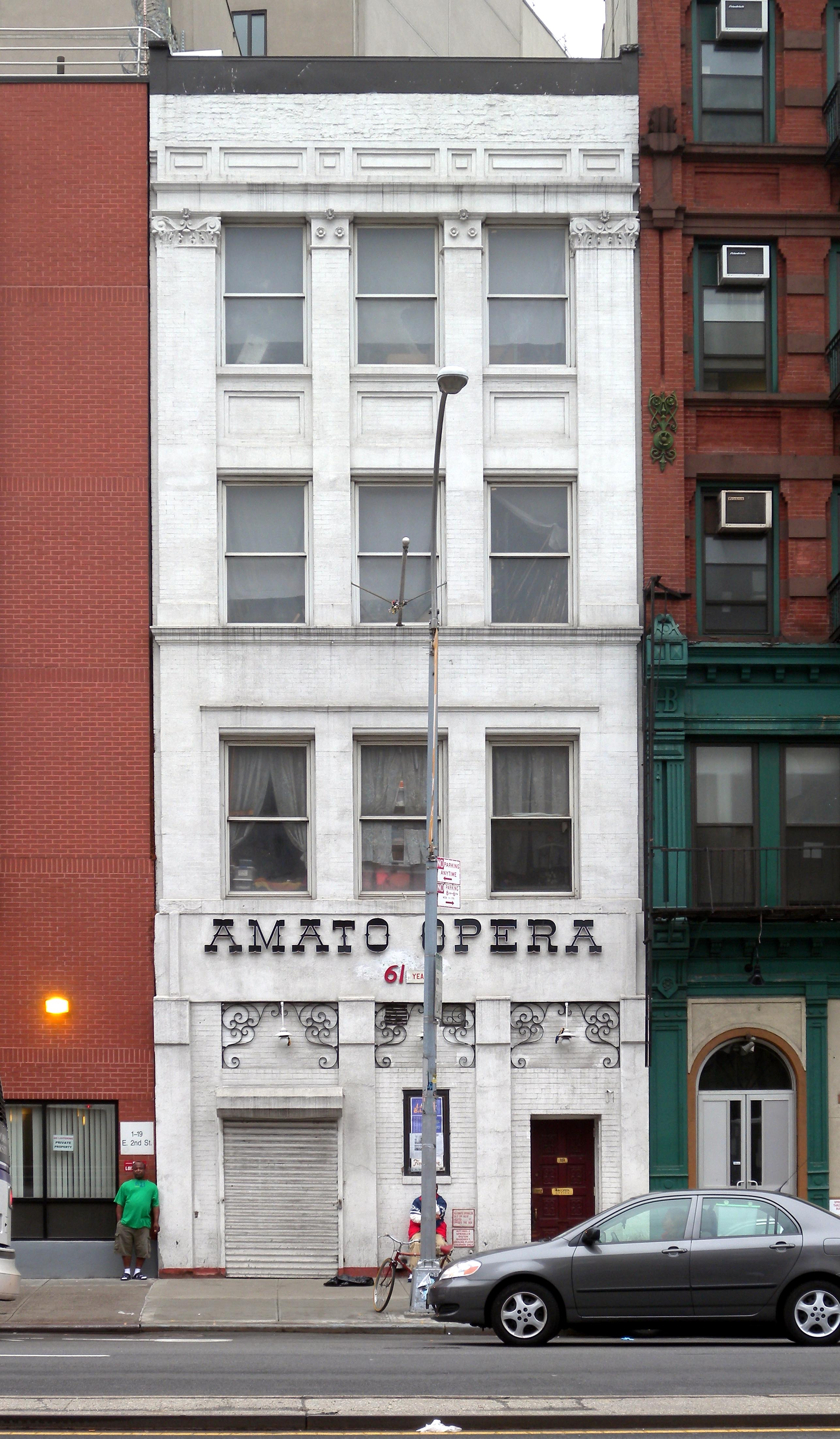
- Amato Opera's home at 319 Bowery in New York City, May 2009
- Interactive map of Amato Opera
- Location: East Village, Manhattan, New York City
- Type: Opera company

Construction
- Opened: 1948
- Closed: 2009

The Amato Opera was an opera company located in the East Village neighborhood of Manhattan in New York City. The company was produced by the husband-and-wife team of Anthony and Sally Amato and presented opera on a small scale with a reduced orchestra at low prices. From 1948 to its closure in 2009, it encouraged and trained many young singers.

== Early years ==
The company was founded in 1948 by husband-and-wife team Anthony (July 21, 1920 – December 13, 2011) and Sally Bell Amato (September 27, 1917 – August 16, 2000). Tony Amato acted as artistic director, choosing the repertoire, rehearsing and conducting the operas. In the early productions, he often cast students from his opera classes at The America Theatre Wing, where he was the Director of the Opera Workshop. There was no admission charge for the company's early performances, because union rules prohibited it. Instead, during the intermission the Amatos would "pass the hat around" for contributions. Sally acted as costumier, ran lights and box office and managed publicity and business matters. Under the alias Serafina Bellantoni, she sang in productions for over fifty years.

Their first production, Rossini's The Barber of Seville, was mounted in the auditorium of Our Lady of Pompeii Church at Bleecker and Carmine Streets. The following week, the company produced Cavalleria rusticana and Pagliacci. The company used many other locations in its early years, including the Kaufman Auditorium of the 92nd Street Y, the Fashion Institute of Technology, and Washington Irving High School auditorium.

In 1951, the company moved into its first permanent home at 159 Bleecker Street. In its new 299-seat theatre, the company gave four performances during nearly every weekend of the year. The company's repertory soon spanned 21 different operas, and it gave over 1,296 performances at the theatre. Productions were occasionally presented in nearby cities, such as New London and New Haven, Connecticut, and abridged children's performances were also given at The Town Hall. The Bleecker Street theatre closed in 1959, but the company continued to perform at other venues, including The Town Hall and 126 West 23rd Street.

== Later years ==
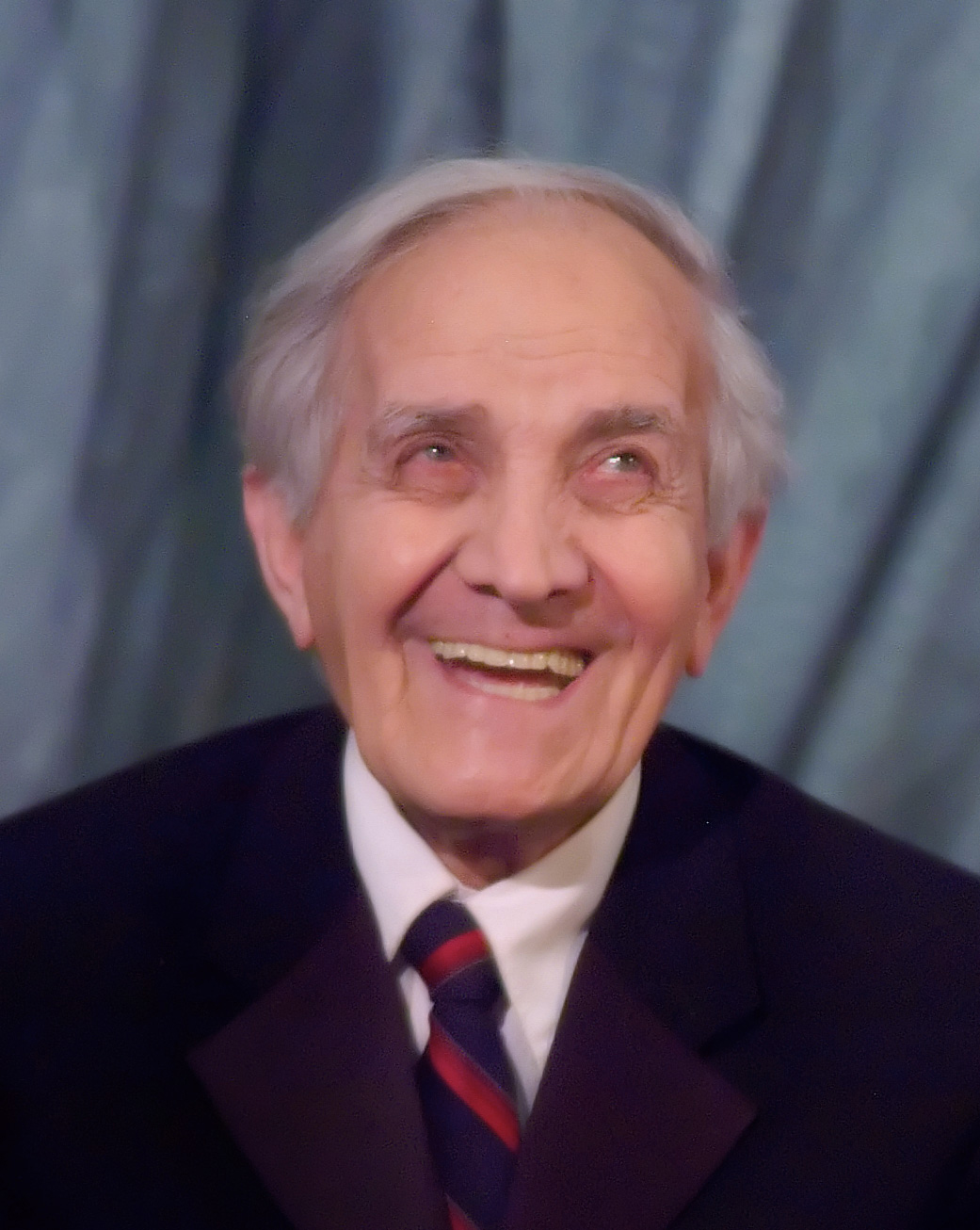
Anthony Amato

Amato found a new permanent home in 1964 in a four-story building, next to a gas station and near the famous rock club CBGB, at 319 Bowery near Second Street, a former Mission House and restaurant supply store, which was converted into a theatre with rehearsal and storage space, 107 seats, a 20-foot stage and a tiny orchestra pit.

Each season included five or six different operas, typically a mix of comedies and tragedies, and the repertory eventually expanded to over 60 operas. Each opera ran over five weekends, and the company used multiple rotating casts. Amato also mounted Saturday morning Opera-In-Brief performances. Aimed at children, the Opera-In-Brief performances were full-length short operas or abridged versions of longer operas interspersed with narration. Throughout its life, Amato Opera maintained a policy of keeping prices low, charging only $1.80 a seat in 1964. By 1975 ticket prices were $3–4 and in 1998, they were $23. In 2008, tickets were $35 ($30 for students, children, and seniors), still modest compared to those at larger opera houses. PBS made a documentary film about Amato in 2001 called Amato: A Love Affair With Opera. PBS wrote, "The Amato Opera has grown famous as a testing ground for young singers; many of its performers have gone on to sing, direct, and conduct in opera companies around the world ... The orchestra is phenomenal. The sets, designed by Richard Cerullo for the past twenty years, are wonderfully designed to make the most of the Amato's small stage. And what the theater lacks in seating capacity it makes up for in intimacy."

Productions in the small theater often featured a small ensemble of musicians who sat directly beneath the stage. Other times, the singers were accompanied only by a piano in the pit. The intimate setting resulted in a different operatic experience. In some cases, acting could be less exaggerated than in a larger house. Though the stage was small, scenery was typically fully realized and often quite striking visually. Because the singers were so close to the audience, it was easier to discern the individual parts in group scenes, such as quartets. Many productions benefitted from Amato's humor, and audiences were often amused at the opening of operas when two small chandeliers were hoisted up to the ceiling, mimicking the raising of the grand chandeliers at the Metropolitan Opera house.

Amato Opera received commendations and awards from Mayors Abe Beame, Ed Koch and Rudy Giuliani, and the Amatos were inducted into City Lore's Peoples' Hall of Fame, honored by the American Cultural Roundtable, and the Italian Heritage and Cultural Committee, in recognition for their contribution to the artistic life of New York City.

== Closure ==
Amato Opera closed after its last performance of The Marriage of Figaro on May 31, 2009. Anthony Amato announced the planned closure on January 10, 2009, before a performance of The Merry Widow. He told The New York Times, "Now, with Sally gone, I have decided that it is time for me to start a new chapter in my life".

Following the closure of the Amato Opera, some of the former performers and members of the Amato board of directors formed Amore Opera. Tony Amato gave all the sets and costumes of Amato Opera to this new company. Amore Opera has continued to present opera seasons since then. Another successor company, Bleecker Street Opera, performed from 2010 through 2011. In 2013, another former Amato performer formed Opera Theatre of Montclair in New Jersey, which ran until 2018.

In 2010, Amato published a book about the company called The Smallest Grand Opera in the World. Amato died on December 13, 2011.
