= Big Tom (New York) =

Mountain in New York, United States

- Location within New York Location within the United States

Highest point
- Elevation: 2,346 feet (715 m)
- Coordinates: 42°19′42″N 74°53′44″W

Geography
- Location: Delhi, New York, U.S.
- Topo map: USGS Delhi

Big Tom is a mountain located in the Catskill Mountains of New York north-northeast of Delhi. Big Tom is located northwest of Betts Hill and north of Hollister Hill.
