= USS Josephine (SP-913) =

Patrol vessel of the United States Navy

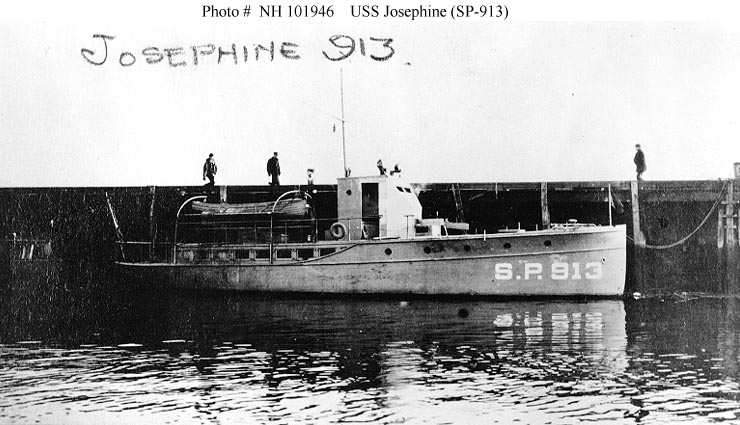
- USS Josephine during World War I.

History

United States
- Name: USS Josephine (1917-1918); USS SP-913 (1918)
- Namesake: Josephine was her previous name retained; SP-913 was her section patrol number
- Builder: New York Yacht, Launch, and Engine Company, Morris Heights, the Bronx, New York
- Completed: 1916
- Acquired: 9 August 1917
- Commissioned: 20 September 1917
- Renamed: USS SP-913 11 April 1918
- Fate: Returned to owner 20 December 1918
- Notes: Operated as civilian motorboat Josephine 1916-1917 and from December 1918

General characteristics
- Type: Patrol vessel
- Length: 60 ft (18 m)
- Beam: 13 ft 6 in (4.11 m)
- Draft: 3 ft 3 in (0.99 m)
- Propulsion: Gasoline engine
- Armament: 1 × 3-pounder gun; 1 × machine gun

The first USS Josephine (SP-913), later USS SP-913, was a United States Navy patrol vessel in commission from 1917 to 1918.

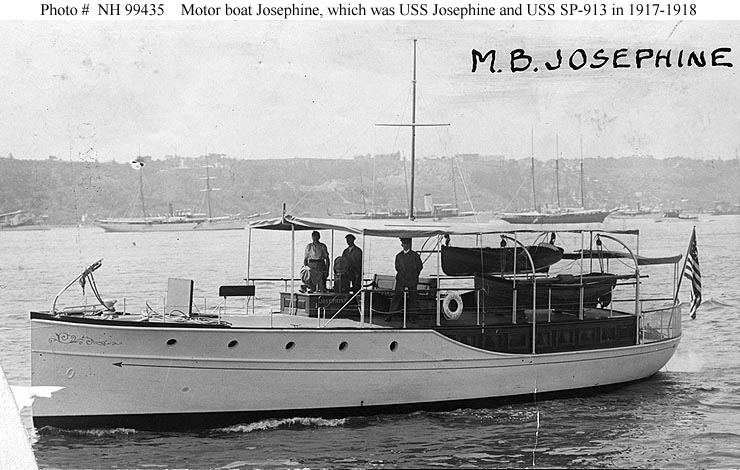
Josephine as a civilian motorboat in New York Harbor in 1916 or 1917, prior to her U.S. Navy service.

Josephine was built as a civilian motorboat of the same name in 1916 by the New York Yacht, Launch, and Engine Company at Morris Heights in the Bronx, New York. The U.S. Navy acquired her from her owner, L. A. Lehmaier, on 9 August 1917 for World War I service as a patrol vessel. She was commissioned as USS Josephine (SP-913) at the New York Navy Yard at Brooklyn, New York, on 20 September 1917.

Attached to the 3rd Naval District, Josephine performed section patrol duty in the New York City area, including Long Island Sound. She was renamed USS SP-913 on 11 April 1918.

"Having proved unsuit(able)" for naval service, on 6 July 1918 the Navy directed that SP-913 be returned to her owner. She was returned to Lehmaier on 20 December 1918.

Josephine (SP-913) should not be confused with two other patrol vessels, USS Josephine (SP-1243) and USS Josephine (SP-3295), which also were in commission in the U.S. Navy during World War I.
