= Cuban Ledge =

Coordinates: 40.8416°N 73.8037°W

Cuban Ledge is a reef or islet composed chiefly of sand and small rocks in Eastchester Bay, the Bronx, in Long Island Sound. It is located between Rodman's Neck and Country Club in Eastchester Bay and is visible only during periods of low tide. It is a hazard to boats, and is marked with a signal tower.

== Origin and name ==
Several stories have been circulated regarding how the Cuban Ledge formed and got its name. According to some accounts, it was formed in 1898 when sailors dumped cargo rocks overboard from a ship that was abandoned when its crew left for Cuba to fight in the Spanish–American War. Another version of the story indicates that it was created when a large barge carrying sand and gravel ran aground on a shoal. A salvage crew was mounted there and the barge was rescued, but much of the sand and gravel it was carrying needed to be removed in order to aid the rescue. The workers dumped the sand and rock overboard to get the barge off the shoal, thus forming the reef.

One story of its name stipulates that a ship by the name of Cuban Lady ran aground on the reef in the 1880s. Other theories suggest that the ledge resembles the outline of the island of Cuba.

== See also ==
- Pelham Islands
