= Eastchester Bay =

Sound in New York City

Coordinates: 40°50′08″N 73°48′07″W

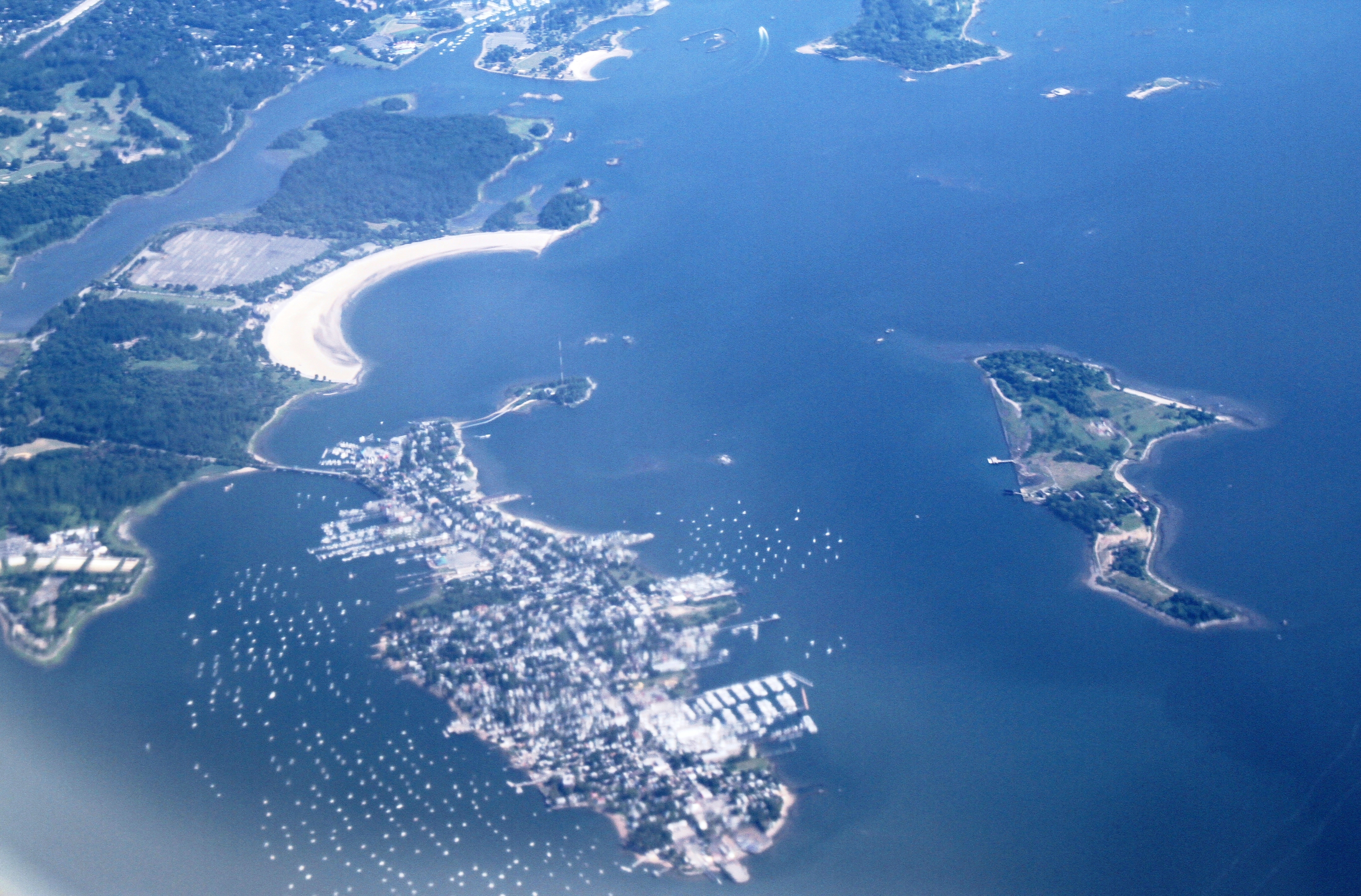
Eastchester Bay - to the left of City Island.

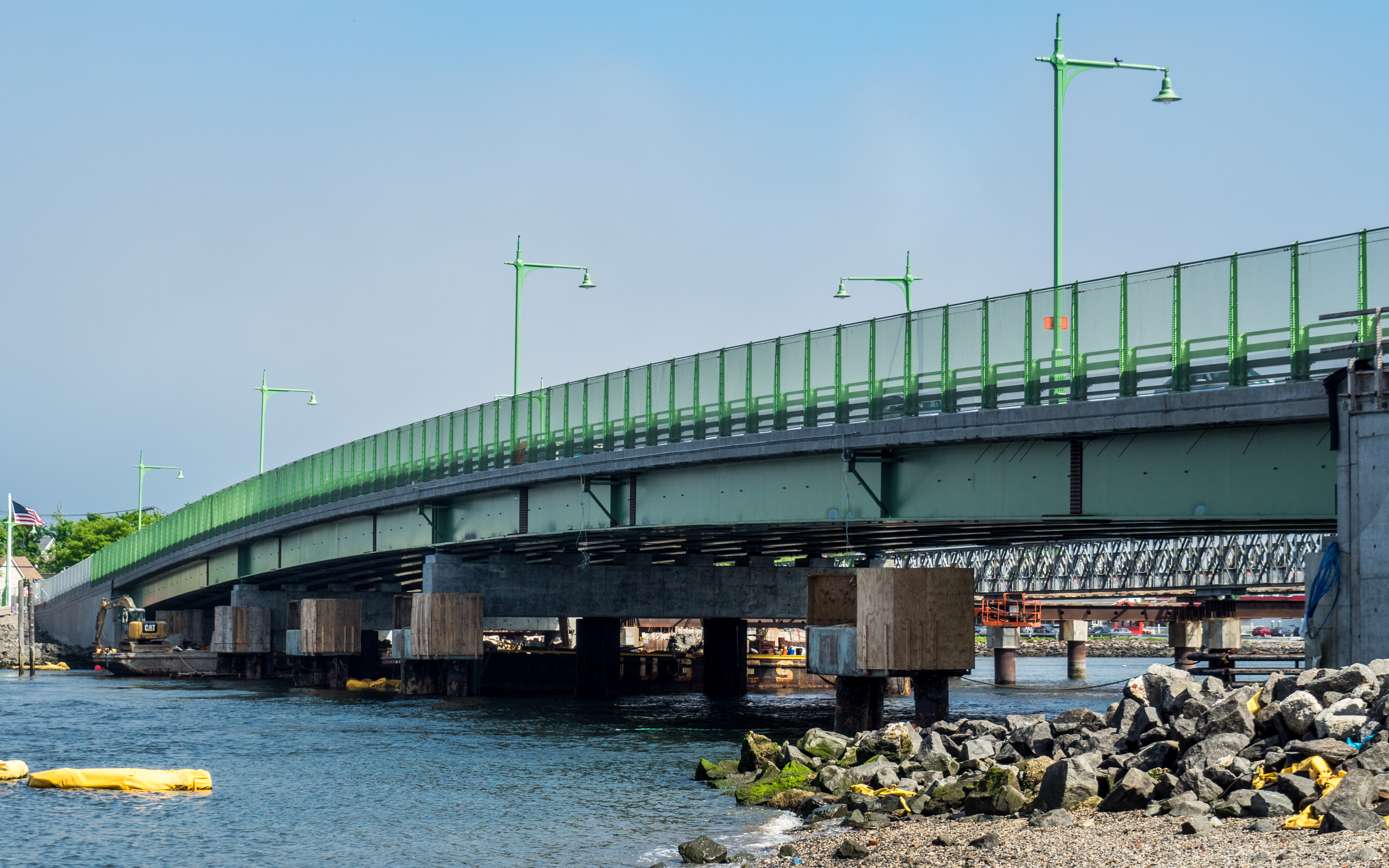
New City Island Causeway Bridge over Eastchester Bay.

Eastchester Bay is a sound between City Island and the mainland Bronx in New York City, New York. Technically, it is not a bay, since it is open to larger bodies of water at both ends. The northern end connects via a narrow channel to Pelham Bay (which is also really a sound, since it, in turn, opens onto Long Island Sound). The Hutchinson River empties into Eastchester Bay near the northern end. The lower portion of the bay opens onto the East River, Little Neck Bay, and Long Island Sound. Eastchester Bay is designated an Essential Fish Habitat by the National Marine Fisheries Service.

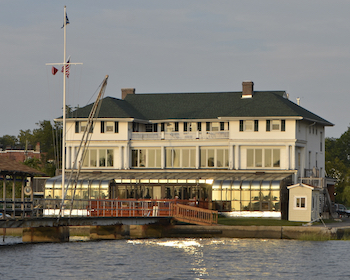
Harlem Yacht Club overlooking Eastchester Bay.

Many yacht clubs and marinas line the bay on both sides, leading to a high level of recreational boating traffic. Traffic is particularly dense on weekends and Wednesday evenings in the summer, when the various clubs run sailboat races. There is also a high volume of commercial traffic. The bay opens onto the main shipping channel into New York from Long Island Sound, which is used by large commercial vessels, high speed ferries, fishing boats, barges under tow, and all manner of vessels restricted in their ability to maneuver. Barge traffic transiting the length of Easchester Bay in and out of the Hutchinson River is constrained to times of high tide, a few hours a day. The bay also sees the occasional seaplane visiting Evers Seaplane Base.

== See also ==
- City Island, Bronx
- City Island Bridge
- Country Club, Bronx
- Cuban Ledge
