= Hunter Island (Bronx) =

Peninsula in the Bronx, New York

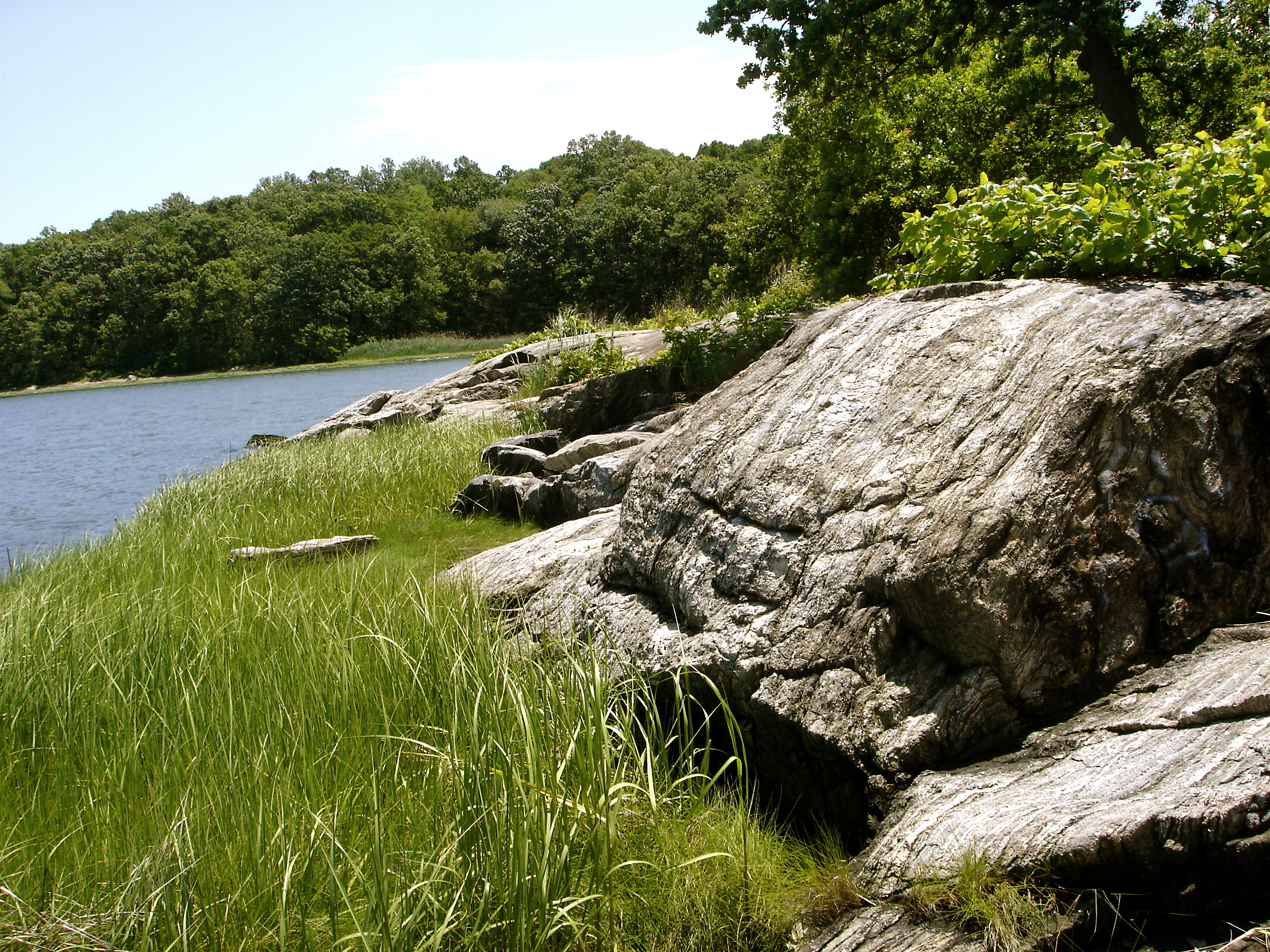
- Northern tip of Hunter Island in Pelham Bay Park
- Location in New York City
- Etymology: John Hunter

Geography
- Location: New York City (Pelham Bay Park, the Bronx), United States
- Coordinates: 40°52′34″N 73°47′24″W
- Archipelago: Pelham Islands
- Adjacent to: Pelham Bay/Long Island Sound
- Area: 166 acres (67 ha)
- Highest elevation: 90 ft (27 m)

Additional information
- Official website: NYC Parks

Hunter Island (also Hunters Island or Hunter's Island) is a 166-acre (67 ha) peninsula and former island in the Bronx, New York City, United States. It is situated on the western end of Long Island Sound, along the sound's northwestern shore, and is part of Pelham Bay Park in the northeastern part of the Bronx. Hunter Island initially covered 215 acres (87 ha) and was one of the Pelham Islands, the historical name for a group of islands in western Long Island Sound that once belonged to Thomas Pell. The island is connected to another former island, Twin Island, on the northeast.

The area around Hunter Island was originally settled by the Siwanoy Native Americans. One of Pell's descendants, Joshua Pell, moved onto the island in 1743. It was subsequently owned by the Hunter and Henderson families, and the island was briefly named Henderson's Island after the latter. Henderson's Island was purchased by politician John Hunter in 1804. Hunter built a mansion on the island and his family resided on the island until 1865, when it was sold to former mayor Ambrose Kingsland. Several other people owned Hunter Island before being incorporated into Pelham Bay Park in 1888. Subsequently, the island became a vacation destination. In the 1930s, New York City parks commissioner Robert Moses extended nearby Orchard Beach, to the south of the island, by connecting Hunter Island to the mainland.

Hunter Island formerly contained Hunter Mansion, which Hunter had built for his family in 1811. It was located on the island's highest point and was destroyed in 1937 when Orchard Beach was expanded onto the island. A causeway connecting Hunter Island to the mainland still exists. Today the former island is part of a wildlife refuge, the Hunter Island Marine Zoology and Geology Sanctuary, which was established in 1967 on the northern shores of Hunter and Twin Islands. The sanctuary includes rock outcroppings and an intertidal marine ecosystem that is not found anywhere else in New York state. Hunter Island also contains the Kazimiroff Nature Trail and Orchard Beach Environmental Center, which was established in 1986 as a tribute to Bronx preservationist Theodore Kazimiroff.

== Geography ==
Hunter Island is located within the northeastern part of Pelham Bay Park, which is itself located in the northeast Bronx, near New York City's northern border. The island's flora largely consists of tracts of old-growth forest that existed prior to the settlement of the New York City area, as well as plants introduced by John Hunter in the 19th century. A 2005 survey by the New York City Department of Parks and Recreation (NYC Parks) found 49 native species as well as four invasive species. Some of the plants found on Hunter Island, including lousewort, alum root, and broad beech fern are seldom found in other New York City parks. The island contains the Hunter Island Marine Zoology and Geology Sanctuary, established in 1967, and the Kazimiroff Nature Trail and Orchard Beach Environmental Center, which opened in 1986.

To the north and west of the former island is LeRoy's Bay, a lagoon nearby that separated Hunter Island from the mainland. The bay was traversed by a stone causeway to Hunter Island. Most of the lagoon was filled in during the mid-1930s reconstruction of Orchard Beach, and the bay became known as the "Orchard Beach Lagoon", or the Lagoon for short.

To the north of Hunter Island is Glen Island Park, outside the city limits in Westchester County. It is separated from Hunter Island via LeRoy's Bay. Glen Island Park is operated by Westchester County, and parking and beach access are open only to Westchester residents.

The eastern part of Hunter Island is adjacent to Hog Island and Cat Briar Island, two tiny islands in Pelham Bay. Hunter Island is also physically attached to Twin Island on the southeast corner. Twin Island was itself formerly two islands called East and West Twin Islands; the westernmost island was connected to Hunter Island via a man-made stone bridge, which now lies in ruins in one of the city's last remaining salt marshes. Twin Island is in turn attached to another former island called Two Trees Island. Twin and Two Trees Islands are now connected to Hunter Island and the mainland by landfill. All six landmasses form part of the Hunter Island Marine Zoology and Geology Sanctuary.

To the south is Orchard Beach and Pelham Bay. Orchard Beach surrounds the bay on its east in a roughly crescent shape, and the northern part of the beach connects Hunter and Twin Islands. The bay formerly adjoined the southern part of Hunter Island, but approximately one third of the original bay was filled in to create Orchard Beach from 1934 to 1938. Orchard Beach's parking lot is located on the southeast side of Hunter Island.

== History ==
The Siwanoy Native Americans who originally occupied the area referred to the general vicinity around Hunter Island as "Laap-Ha-Wach King", or "place of stringing beads". One notable boulder, the "Gray Mare" at the northwestern shore of the island, is a glacial erratic where the Siwanoy would conduct ceremonies. Another boulder was the "Mishow", another important ceremonial site for the Siwanoy, as well as the burial sites of two sachems. Fishing was once conducted on Hunter Island's eastern shore (though not necessarily by the Siwanoy), and on some days, fishermen netted over a thousand pounds of fish. Sources indicate Wampage II, Siwanoy sachem and son of Wampage I, had a stockaded "castle" on Hunter Island in the late 17th century.

The earliest building to be built on the island was the Old Stone House, a small outbuilding that was believed to have been built by an unknown Huguenot prior to 1700. What was later known as Hunter Island was originally part of the Pell estate, and Joshua Pell, a descendant of Thomas Pell, took ownership of the island in 1743. According to a newspaper article from 1933, the Old Stone House was the Pells' residence. The island was subsequently owned by the Hunter and Henderson families. The island was briefly called Henderson's Island after Alexander Henderson, the third owner of the island.

Upon Henderson's death in 1804, the island was offered for lease. John Hunter, a successful businessman and politician, purchased the property shortly afterward. Hunter, his wife Elizabeth, and his son Elias moved to the island in 1813. The Hunters built their own mansion on the island. The Old Stone House, which by then adjoined the mansion, was used as a barn.

John Hunter lived on the estate until his death in 1852. Ownership of the mansion then passed to Elias Hunter. Upon Elias's death in 1865, his son John III was supposed to inherit the land only if he lived on it, as per the senior John Hunter's will. John III, who lived in Throggs Neck instead, sold it to Mayor Ambrose Kingsland in 1866. The land then passed in succession to Alvin Higgins, Gardiner Jorden, and Oliver Iselin. The city then bought the land in 1889 for $324,000 (equivalent to $11,600,000 in 2025). In 1892, Stephen Peabody was given the right to occupy the Hunter Mansion, paying $1,200 a year in rent, in conjunction with his new role as groundskeeper of Hunter Island. Soon afterward, the mansion became a shelter for children operated by the Society of Little Mothers. The barn adjoining the mansion burned down in a fire in approximately 1890, and was abandoned by the early 20th century.

By the early 1900s, Hunter Island had become a popular summer vacation destination, and it hosted a campsite. The Hunter House had been renovated into a hotel. In 1903, due to overcrowding on Hunter Island, NYC Parks opened another campsite at Rodman's Neck on the south tip of the island, with 100 bathhouses. By 1917, Hunter Island saw half a million seasonal visitors. The park's condition started to decline in the 1920s as the surrounding areas were developed. Hunter Island became popular with European immigrants who built shelters and established summer colonies. This led to the island being closed and camping banned, but was unsuccessful at preventing the beachgoers from returning.

Upon taking office in 1934, New York City parks commissioner Robert Moses surveyed every park in the city. Moses devised plans for a new Orchard Beach recreation area after he saw the popularity of the Hunter Island campsite. At the time, the beach was a narrow sand bar connecting Hunter Island and Rodman's Neck. Moses canceled 625 leases for the project, and after campers unsuccessfully sued the city, the site was cleared of campers in June. Moses decided to connect Hunter Island and the Twin Islands to Rodman's Neck by filling in most of LeRoy's Bay, a lagoon located to the west of the island. The deteriorated Hunter Mansion was demolished in 1937 with the construction of the beach. The expanded Orchard Beach was opened on June 25, 1937.

In the 1960s, there were plans to expand a landfill in Pelham Bay Park, which would have created the City's second-largest refuse disposal site next to Fresh Kills in Staten Island. A group of preservationists headed by Dr. Theodore Kazimiroff, a Bronx historian and head of the Bronx Historical Society, lobbied the city to create a wildlife preserve in Hunter Island, one of the sites where the landfill was proposed to be expanded. The preservation effort suffered setbacks in August 1967 when the New York City Board of Estimate voted against an initial effort to create the protected area in the proposed landfill expansion site. On October 11, 1967, Mayor John Lindsay signed a law authorizing in the creation of two wildlife refuges in Pelham Bay Park: the Thomas Pell Wildlife Sanctuary on the western side of the park, and the Hunter Island Marine Zoology and Geology Sanctuary on the former Hunter Island. This was followed by the Kazimiroff Nature Trail and the Pelham Bay Park Environmental Center in 1986. The trail was named after the historian Kazimiroff, who had since died.

== Mansion ==
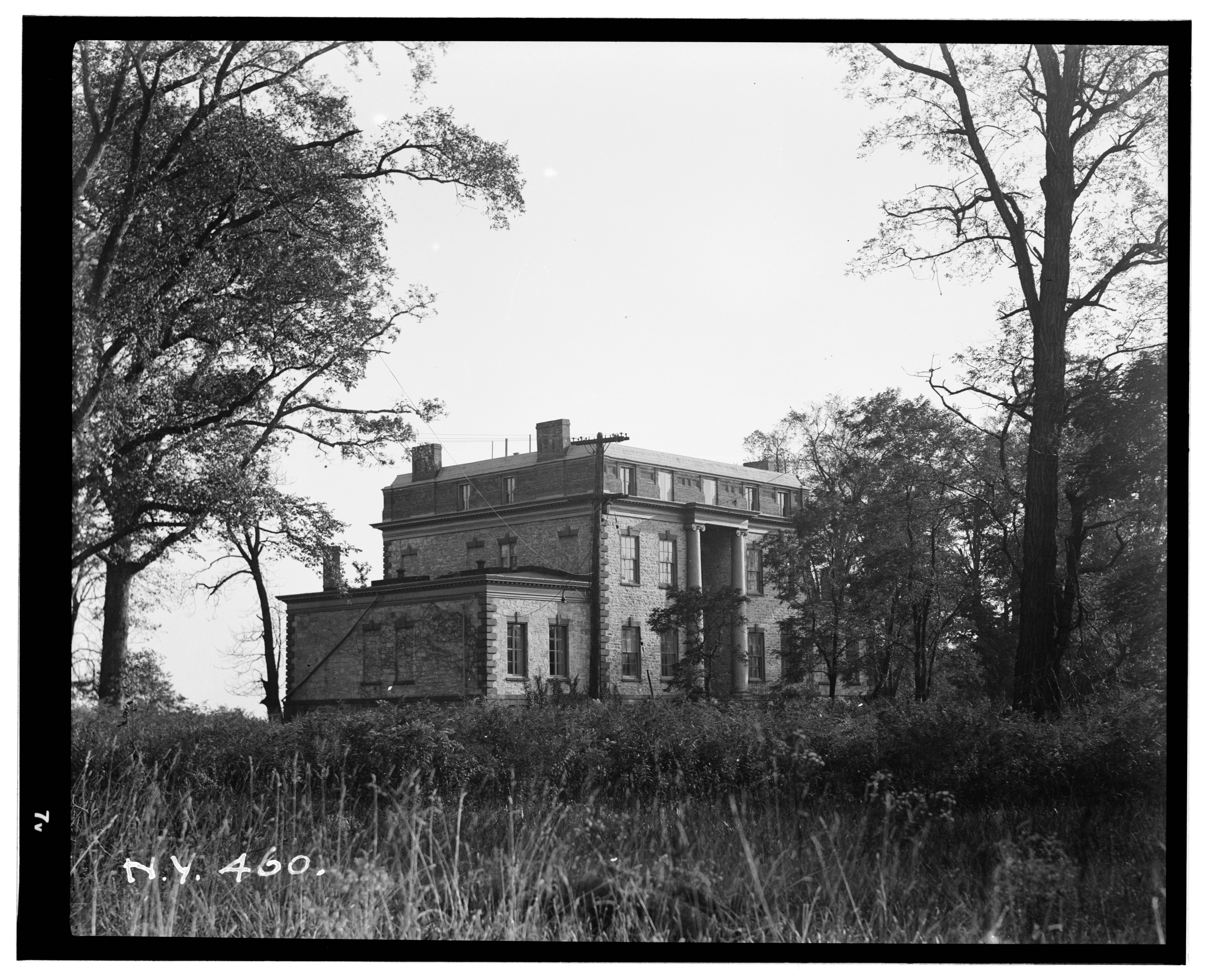
Hunter Mansion

In 1811, the Hunter family built a mansion in the English Georgian style. It was described as one of the finest mansions of the period, with three stories, a large veranda, and terraced gardens leading to the island's shore. The building had a rectangular shape. The main entrance faced west, toward the mainland, and contained a grand doorway flanked by columns. A portico at the back faced the Long Island Sound. The mansion held an art collection of over 400 works from artists such as Rembrandt, Peter Paul Rubens, Anthony van Dyck, and Leonardo da Vinci. The home was situated at the highest point on the island, 90 feet (27 m) above sea level, and had views of Long Island Sound to the east and the hills and woodlands of the Town of Pelham to the north. At the time that the mansion existed, the remainder of the island was mostly lawns, except for a few outbuildings such as the former Old Stone House, as well as a tenant's house and a garden. The mansion was demolished in 1937 after a long period of deterioration.

The stone causeway connected the island to the mainland. The entrance to the causeway from Eastern Boulevard (present-day Shore Road), on the mainland, was marked by two white granite gateposts. The Hunter's Island Inn, a mansion owned by Elias Hunter's daughter Elizabeth de Lancey, was located across from the gateposts. The causeway blocked the flow of water in LeRoy's Bay. The bridge's remnants still exist as of 2017.

== Wildlife sanctuary ==
Hunter Island Marine Zoology and Geology Sanctuary encompasses all of Twin Islands, Cat Briar Island, Two Trees Island, and the northeastern shoreline of Hunter Island. It contains many glacial erratics, large boulders that were deposited during the last glacial period. The rocky coast of Twin Islands contains the southernmost outcropping of Hartland schist, the major bedrock component of New England coastlines, as well as granite with both migmatite dikes and veins made of quartz. The sanctuary supports a unique intertidal marine ecosystem that is rare in New York State. It holds the largest continuous oak forest in Pelham Bay Park, including white, red, and black oak, as well as black cherry, white poplar, white pines, Norway spruce, and black locust trees. One can also find grape hyacinth, periwinkle, daylily, and Tartarian honeysuckle, which were part of the Hunter Mansion's garden. Member species of the islands' salt marsh ecosystem include egrets, cormorants, fiddler crabs, horseshoe crabs, marine worms, barnacles, and oysters.

== Kazimiroff Nature Trail ==
In 1983, the Theodore Kazimiroff Environmental Center was proposed for the park, alongside a nature trail that would wind through the park's terrain. It would be named out of respect to the late Kazimiroff, who had died in 1980. The Kazimiroff Nature Trail, as well as the Pelham Bay Park Environmental Center at Orchard Beach, opened in June 1986.

The Kazimiroff Nature Trail traverses 189 acres (76 ha) of Hunter Island. Much of the island's natural features are found along the trail. The trail comprises two overlapping lasso-shaped paths, the "red" and "blue" trails. The blue trail is slightly longer than the red trail.

Along the shared "lasso spur" is a canal for mosquito control as well as an intersection with the old Hunter Island causeway's cobblestone approach path. Going counterclockwise from the intersection with the two "loops", the trail passes through a grove of 100 Norway spruces planted in 1918; a black locust forest from the 1970s; and a thicket of shrubs and vines. At this point, the longer blue trail diverges to the northwest and then northeast, passing the former Hunter Mansion's knoll; a forest of white pines; some mugwort and invasive Ailanthus; the Hunter Mansion's main driveway; a less dense patch of trees and burnt tree stumps, part of a forest burned by the Siwanoy; white oaks and black locusts; and lichen-covered boulders, a rare occurrence in New York City parks. The shorter red trail goes directly north through a white poplar forest; a grove scorched by an uncontrolled fire; and remnants of the former estates' stone walls. Both trails merge and loop back to the east and south, passing through glacial-erratic boulders, New England bedrock, and the island's salt marsh. The Gray Mare glacial erratic can also be seen along this stretch.

== Sources ==
1. American Scenic and Historic Preservation Society (1909). Annual Report to the Legislature of the State of New York.
2. Caro, Robert (1974). The Power Broker: Robert Moses and the Fall of New York. New York: Knopf. ISBN 978-0-394-48076-3.
3. "Creating the Sanctuaries" (PDF). Pelham Bay Park. New York City Department of Parks and Recreation. October 11, 1987. Archived from the original (PDF) on September 2, 2016.
4. "Kazimiroff Nature Trail" (PDF). Pelham Bay Park. New York City Department of Parks and Recreation. July 2003. Archived from the original (PDF) on September 2, 2016.
5. O'Hea Anderson, Marianne (June 1996). "Native Americans" (PDF). Administrator's Office, Van Cortlandt & Pelham Bay Parks, City of New York Parks & Recreation. Archived from the original (PDF) on September 2, 2016.
6. "ORCHARD BEACH BATHHOUSE AND PROMENADE" (PDF). nyc.gov. New York City Landmarks Preservation Commission. June 20, 2006. Archived from the original (PDF) on June 12, 2018.
7. Seitz, Sharon; Miller, Stuart (June 6, 2011). The Other Islands of New York City: A History and Guide (Third ed.). Countryman Press. ISBN 978-1-58157-886-7.
8. Ultan, Lloyd; Olson, Shelley (2015). The Bronx: The Ultimate Guide to New York City's Beautiful Borough. Rivergate Regionals Collection. Rutgers University Press. ISBN 978-0-8135-7320-5.
