= Port of New York and New Jersey =

Port in the northeastern US

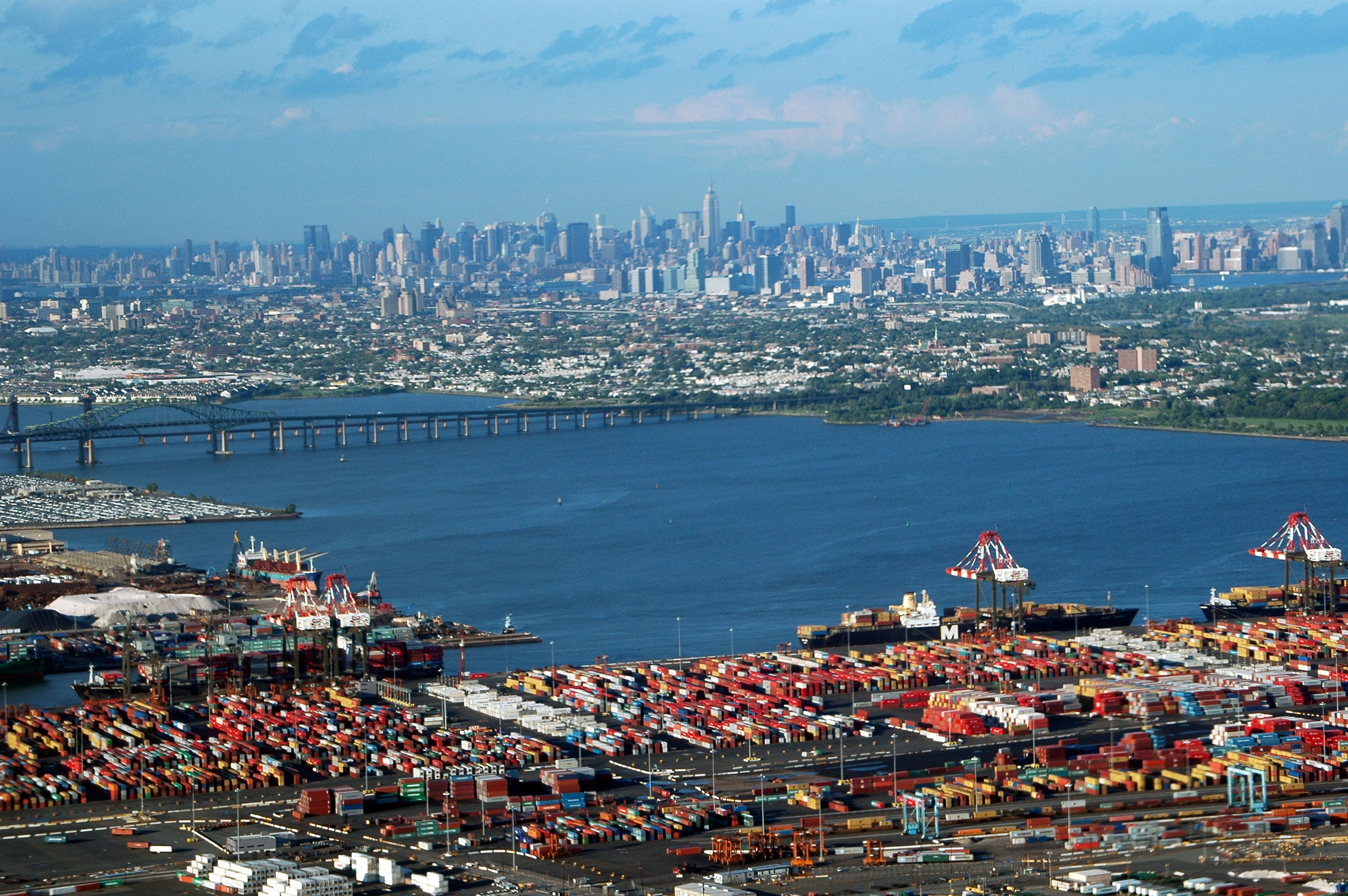
- Port Newark–Elizabeth Marine Terminal on Newark Bay is the busiest container terminal on the East Coast of the United States.
- Interactive map of Port of New York and New Jersey
- Location within the United States

Location
- Coordinates: 40°40′06″N 74°02′44″W

Details
- Draft depth: 50 feet (15 m)
- Air draft: 228 feet (69 m), restricted by Verrazzano Bridge; 215 feet (66 m), restricted by Bayonne Bridge

The Port of New York and New Jersey is the port district of the New York–Newark metropolitan area, encompassing a region within a 25-mile (40 km) radius of the Statue of Liberty National Monument.

It includes the system of navigable waterways in the New York–New Jersey Harbor Estuary, which runs along over 770 miles (1,240 km) of shoreline in the vicinity of New York City and northeastern New Jersey, and is considered one of the largest natural harbors in the world.

Having long been the busiest port on the East Coast it became the busiest port by maritime cargo volume in the United States in 2022 and is a major economic engine for the region.

The region's airports make the port the nation's top gateway for international flights and its busiest center for overall passenger and air freight flights. There are two foreign-trade zones (FTZ) within the port.

== Geography ==
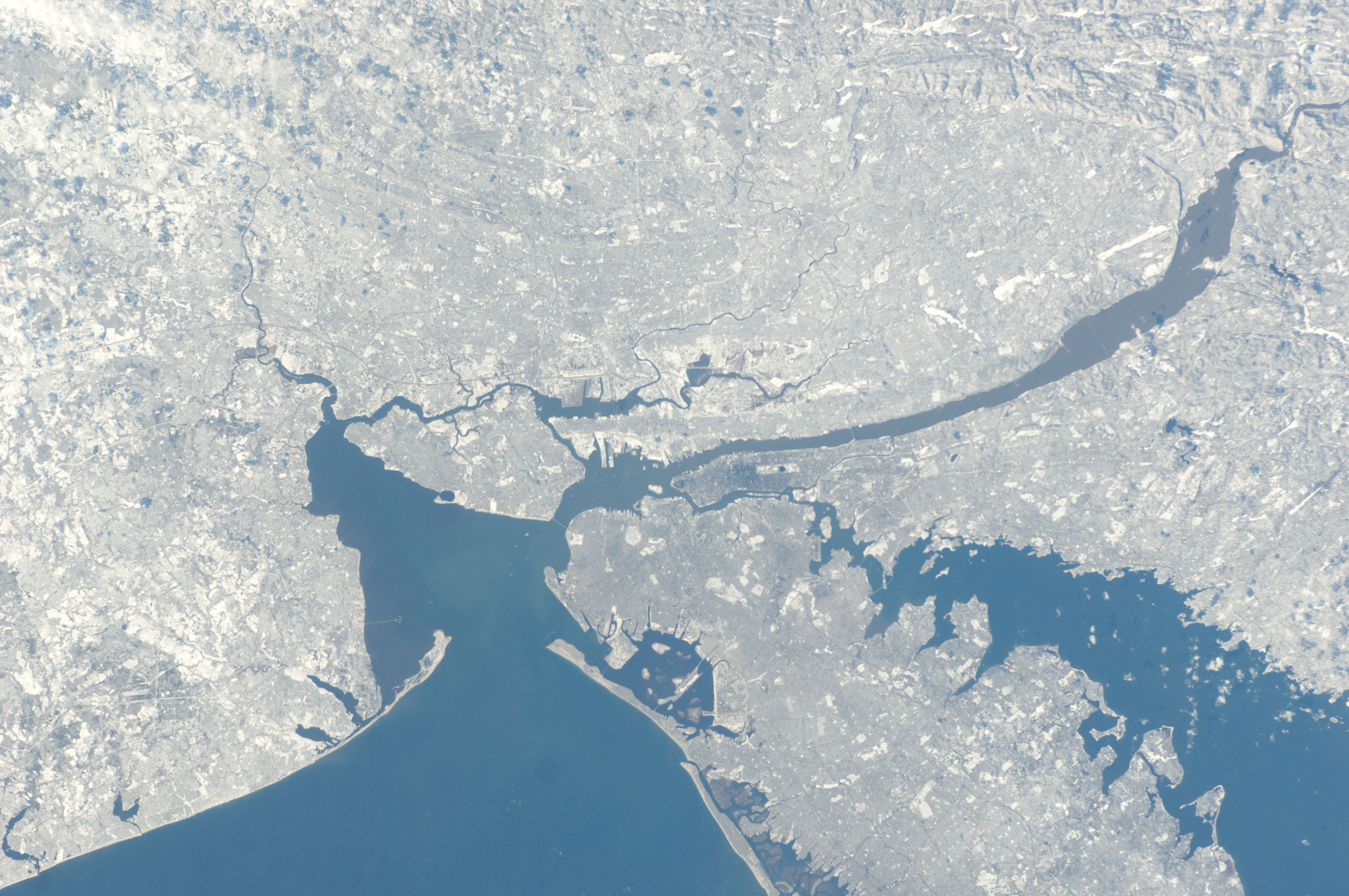
NASA image of the greater Newark and New York area, including the port district

=== Port district ===
Encompassing an area within an approximate 25-mile (40 km) radius of the Statue of Liberty National Monument, the port district comprises all or part of seventeen counties in the region. The nine that are completely within the district are Hudson, Bergen, Essex, Union (in New Jersey), and the five boroughs of New York City, which are coterminous with the counties of New York, Bronx, Kings, Queens, and Richmond. Abutting sections of Passaic, Middlesex, Monmouth, Morris, and Somerset in New Jersey, and Nassau, Westchester, and Rockland in New York are also within the district.

=== Waterways ===
==== Bodies of water ====
New York Harbor is one of the world's largest natural harbors.

The Atlantic Ocean is to the southeast of the port. The sea at the entrance to the port is called the New York Bight; it lies between the peninsulas of Sandy Hook and Rockaway.

In Lower New York Bay and its western arm, Raritan Bay, vessels orient themselves for passage to the west into Arthur Kill or Raritan River or to the north to The Narrows. To the east lies the Rockaway Inlet, which leads to Jamaica Bay. The Narrows connects to the Upper New York Bay at the mouth of the Hudson River, which is sometimes (particularly in navigation) called the North River. Large ships are able to navigate upstream to the Port of Albany-Rensselaer. To the west lies Kill van Kull, the strait leading to Newark Bay, fed by the Passaic River and Hackensack River, and the northern entrance of Arthur Kill.

The Gowanus Canal and Buttermilk Channel are entered from the east. The East River is a broad strait that travels north to Newtown Creek and the Harlem River, turning east at Hell Gate before opening to Long Island Sound, which provides an outlet to the open sea.

==== Channels ====
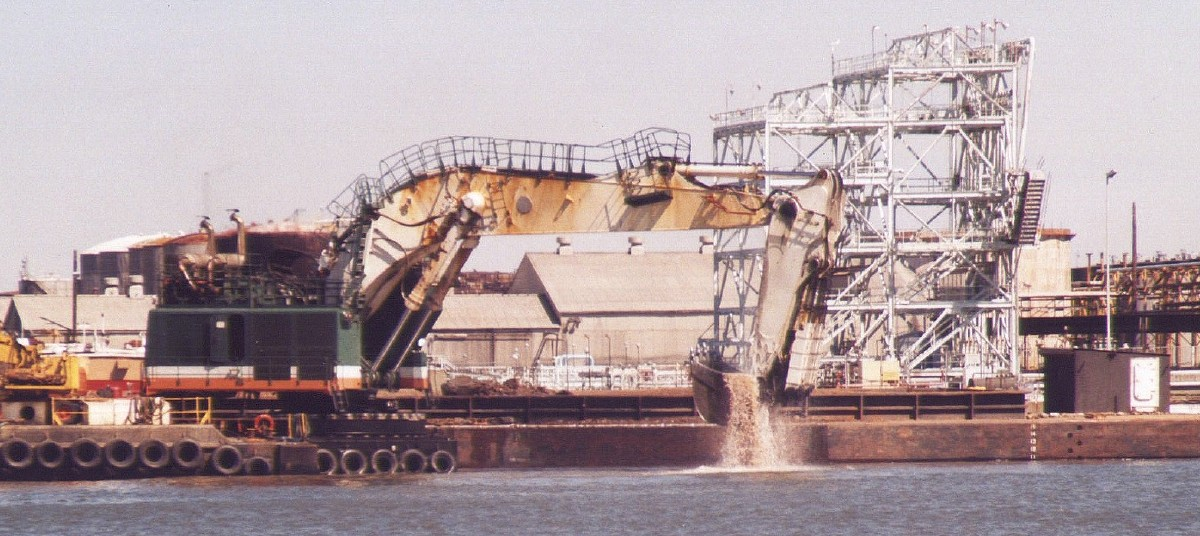
Deepening of Kill van Kull

The port consists of a complex of approximately 240 miles (386 km) of shipping channels, as well as anchorages and port facilities. Most vessels require pilotage, and larger vessels require tugboat assistance for the sharper channel turns.

The Ambrose leads from the sea to the Upper Bay, where it becomes the Anchorage Channel. Connecting channels are the Bay Ridge, the Red Hook, the Buttermilk, the Claremont, the Port Jersey, the Kill Van Kull, the Newark Bay, the Port Newark, the Elizabeth, and the Arthur Kill. Anchorages are known as Stapleton, Bay Ridge and Gravesend.

The natural depth of the harbor is about 17 feet (5 m), but it was deepened over the years, to a controlling depth of about 24 feet (7 m) in 1880. By 1891, the Main Ship Channel was minimally 30 feet (9 m) deep. Following the Rivers and Harbors Act of 1899 over $1.2 million of initial funding was appropriated for the dredging of 40 ft (12.2 m)-deep channels at Bay Ridge, Red Hook, and Sandy Hook. In 1914, Ambrose Channel became the main entrance to the port, at 40 feet (12 m) deep and 2,000 feet (600 m) wide. During World War II the main channel was dredged to 45 feet (14 m) deep to accommodate larger ships up to Panamax size.

In 2016, the Army Corps of Engineers completed a $2.1 billion dredging project, deepening harbor channels to 50 feet (15 m) in order to accommodate Post-Panamax container vessels, which can pass through the widened Panama Canal as well as the Suez Canal.

This has been a source of environmental concern along channels connecting the container facilities in Port Newark to the Atlantic. PCBs and other pollutants lay in a blanket just underneath the soil. In June 2009 it was announced that 200,000 cubic yards of dredged PCBs would be "cleaned" and stored en masse at the site of the former Yankee Stadium and at Brooklyn Bridge Park.

In many areas the sandy bottom has been excavated down to rock and now requires blasting. Dredging equipment then picks up the rock and disposes of it. At one point in 2005, there were 70 pieces of dredging equipment working to deepen channels, the largest fleet of dredging equipment anywhere in the world.

The channel of the Hudson is the Anchorage Channel and is approximately 50 feet deep in the midpoint of Upper Bay. A project to replace two water mains between Brooklyn and Staten Island, which will eventually allowing for dredging of the channel to nearly 100 feet (30 m), was begun in April 2012. The Army Corps has recommended that most channels in the port be maintained at 50 feet deep. Dredging of the canals to 50 feet was completed in August 2016.

The channels also include bridges that limit the heights of vessels that can use the harbor. The Verrazzano–Narrows Bridge has a clearance of 228 feet (69.5 m) at mean high water. The Brooklyn Bridge has 135 feet (41.1 m) of clearance, while the Bayonne Bridge has been raised from 155 feet (47.2 m) to 215 feet (65.5 m).

==== Pilotage ====
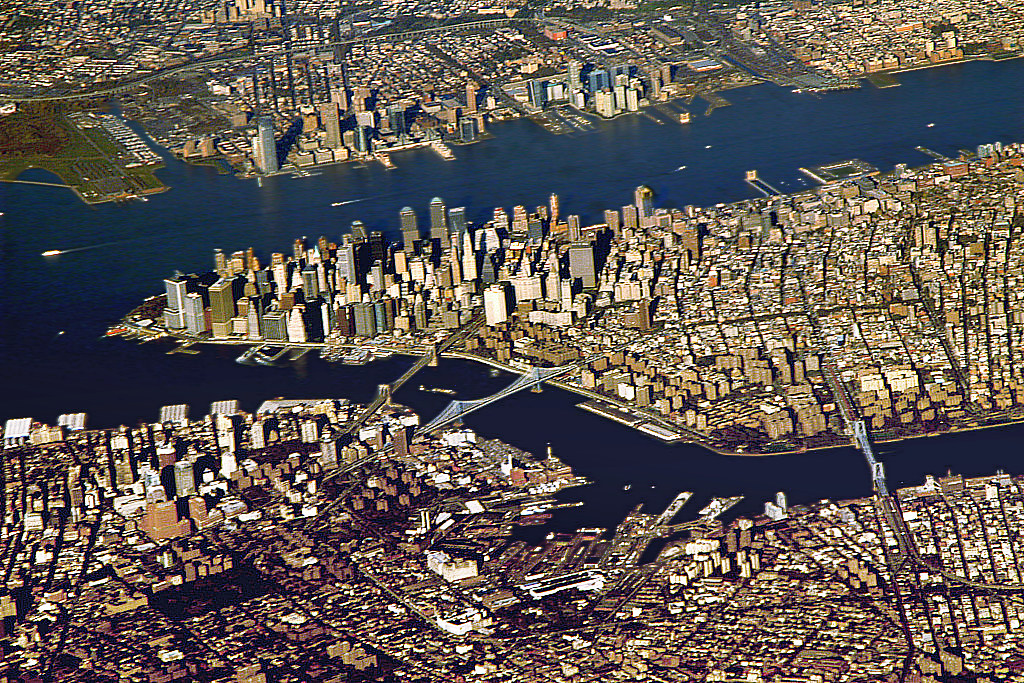
The Port of New York and New Jersey grew from the original harbor at the convergence of the Hudson River and the East River at the Upper New York Bay.

The Sandy Hook Pilots are licensed maritime pilots that go aboard oceangoing vessels, passenger liners, freighters, and tankers and are responsible for the navigation of larger ships through port district.

== History ==
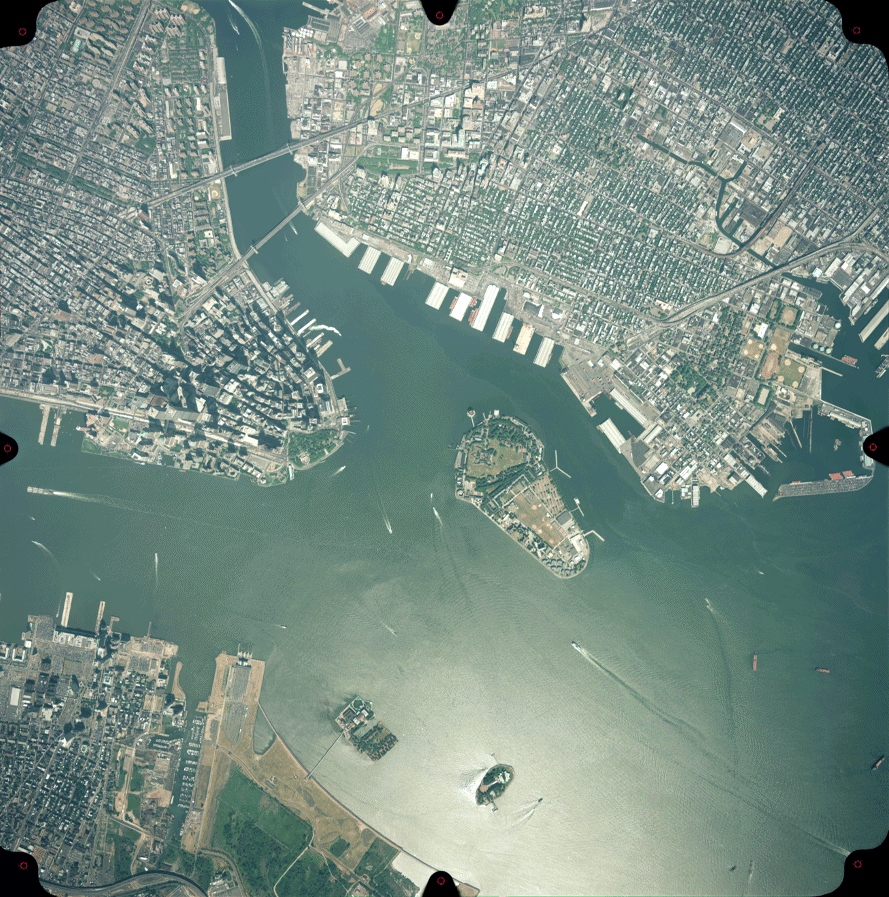
New York Harbor at Upper Bay in 1999: Manhattan (left), Brooklyn (top), Jersey City (bottom), Ellis Island (left) and Liberty Island (right), Governors Island (the largest at center)

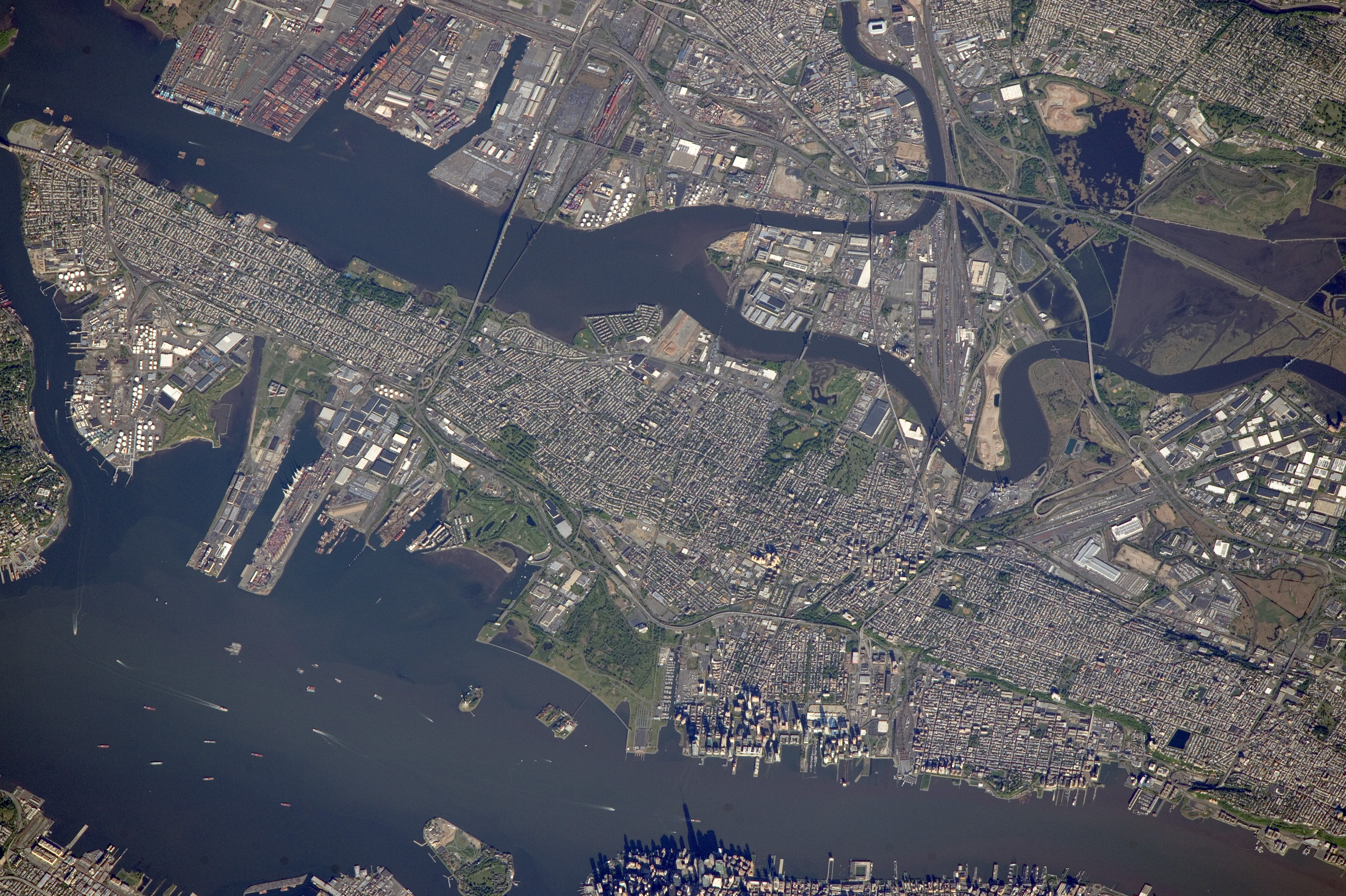
Aerial view of Upper New York Bay-Port Jersey and Newark Bay-Port Newark-Elizabeth

=== Early history ===
The estuary was originally the territory of the Lenape, a seasonally migrational people who would relocate summer encampments along its shore and use its waterways for transport and fishing. Many of the tidal salt marshes supported vast oyster banks that remained a major source of food for the region until the end of the 19th century, by which time contamination and landfilling had obliterated most of them.

The first recorded European visit was that of Giovanni da Verrazzano, who anchored in The Narrows in 1524. For the next hundred years, the region was visited sporadically by ships on fishing trips and slave raids.

European colonization began after Henry Hudson's 1609 exploration of the region with the establishment of New Amsterdam, the capital of the Dutch province of New Netherland at the tip of Manhattan. The British colonial era saw a concerted effort to expand the port in the triangular trade between Europe, Africa, and North America with a concentration of wharves along the mouth of the East River. After the Battle of Brooklyn, the British controlled the harbor for the duration of American Revolutionary War, and prison ships housed thousands at Wallabout Bay.

=== 19th century ===
In the early 19th century, the Erie Canal (often used for grain) and Morris Canal (mostly used for anthracite) gave the port access to the American interior, leading to transshipment operations, manufacturing, and industrialization. The invention of the steam engine led to expansion of the railroads and vast terminals along the western banks of the Hudson River, complemented by an extensive network of ferries and carfloats, with a large cluster along the Harlem River. The era of the ocean liner around the turn of the 20th century led to the creation of berths at North River piers and Hoboken. This coincided with the immigration of millions, processed at Castle Clinton and later at Ellis Island, some staying in the region, others boarding barges, ships, and trains to points across the United States. In 1910, the port was the busiest in the world.

=== 20th century ===
During the World Wars the waterfront supported shipyards and military installations such as the Federal Shipbuilding and Drydock Company and the Brooklyn Navy Yard and played an important role in troop transport as a Port of Embarkation. The mid-century also saw the construction of major highways such as the Belt Parkway, East River Drive, and Major Deegan Expressway along parts of the shoreline.

After the end of World War I, the 1919 New York City Harbor Strike shut down the port for weeks.

The era of the longshoreman, captured in the classic film On the Waterfront, faded by the 1970s as much of the waterfront became obsolete due to changing transportation patterns. The nation's first facility for container shipping, which became the prototype, opened in 1962. Expanded intermodal freight transport systems and the Interstate Highway System effected a shift to new terminals at Newark Bay.

Since the 1980s, sections of waterfront in the traditional harbor have been being redeveloped to include public access to the water's edge, with the creation of linear park greenways such as Hudson River Park, Hudson River Waterfront Walkway, and Brooklyn Bridge Park.

=== 21st century ===
The OOCL Berlin, the largest ship at the time to call at an East Coast port, passed under the raised Bayonne Bridge in July 2017. Two larger ships MSC Cristina and the MSC Virgo landed in 2021.

== Jurisdiction and regulation ==
Responsibilities within the port are divided among all levels of government, from municipal to federal, as well as public and private agencies.

Established in 1921, the bi-state Port Authority of New York and New Jersey, in addition to overseeing maritime facilities, is responsible for the vehicular crossings and the rapid transit system between New York and New Jersey, several of the region's airports, and other transportation and real estate development projects.

The Port Authority maintains its own police force, as does the Waterfront Commission, created in 1953 to investigate, prosecute, and prevent criminal activity.

The United States Army Corps of Engineers, which has been involved in harbor maintenance since about 1826, when Congress passed an omnibus rivers and harbors act, is responsible for bulkhead and channel maintenance.

The United States Coast Guard deals with issues such as floatable debris, spills, vessel rescues, and counter-terrorism.

Both states, and some municipal governments (New York City, in particular), maintain maritime police units. The United States Park Police monitors federal properties. The National Park Service oversees some of the region's historic sites, nature reserves, and parks.

The port is a port of entry. The United States Customs and Border Protection (CBP) and Immigration and Customs Enforcement (ICE) regulate international imports and passenger arrivals. The "green lane" program, in which trusted shippers have fewer containers inspected. There are two foreign trade zones in the port: FTZ 1, the first in the nation, established in 1937, on the New York side of the port; and FTZ 49, on the New Jersey side.

In March 2006, some of the passenger facilities management was to be transferred to Dubai Ports World. There was considerable controversy over security and ownership by a foreign corporation, particularly one of Arab origin, of a U.S. port operation, despite the fact that the operator was British-based P&O Ports. DP World later sold P&O's American operations to American International Group's asset management division, Global Investment Group, for an undisclosed sum.

The Seamen's Church Institute of New York and New Jersey, the Teamsters, and the International Longshoremen's Association assist and represent some of the port's mariners and dockworkers.

== Cargo infrastructure ==
=== Airports ===
The airports in the Port of New York and New Jersey combine to create the largest airport system in the United States, the second in the world in terms of passenger traffic, and the first in the world in terms of total flight operations. JFK air freight cargo operations make it the busiest in the US. FedEx Express, the world's busiest cargo airline, uses Newark Liberty International Airport as its regional hub.

=== Container terminals ===
Port of New York and New Jersey container terminals
1 Port Newark/Elizabeth Marine Terminal
2 Port Jersey Marine Terminal/GCT Bayonne
3 Howland Hook Marine Terminal/GCT New York
4 Red Hook Marine Terminal

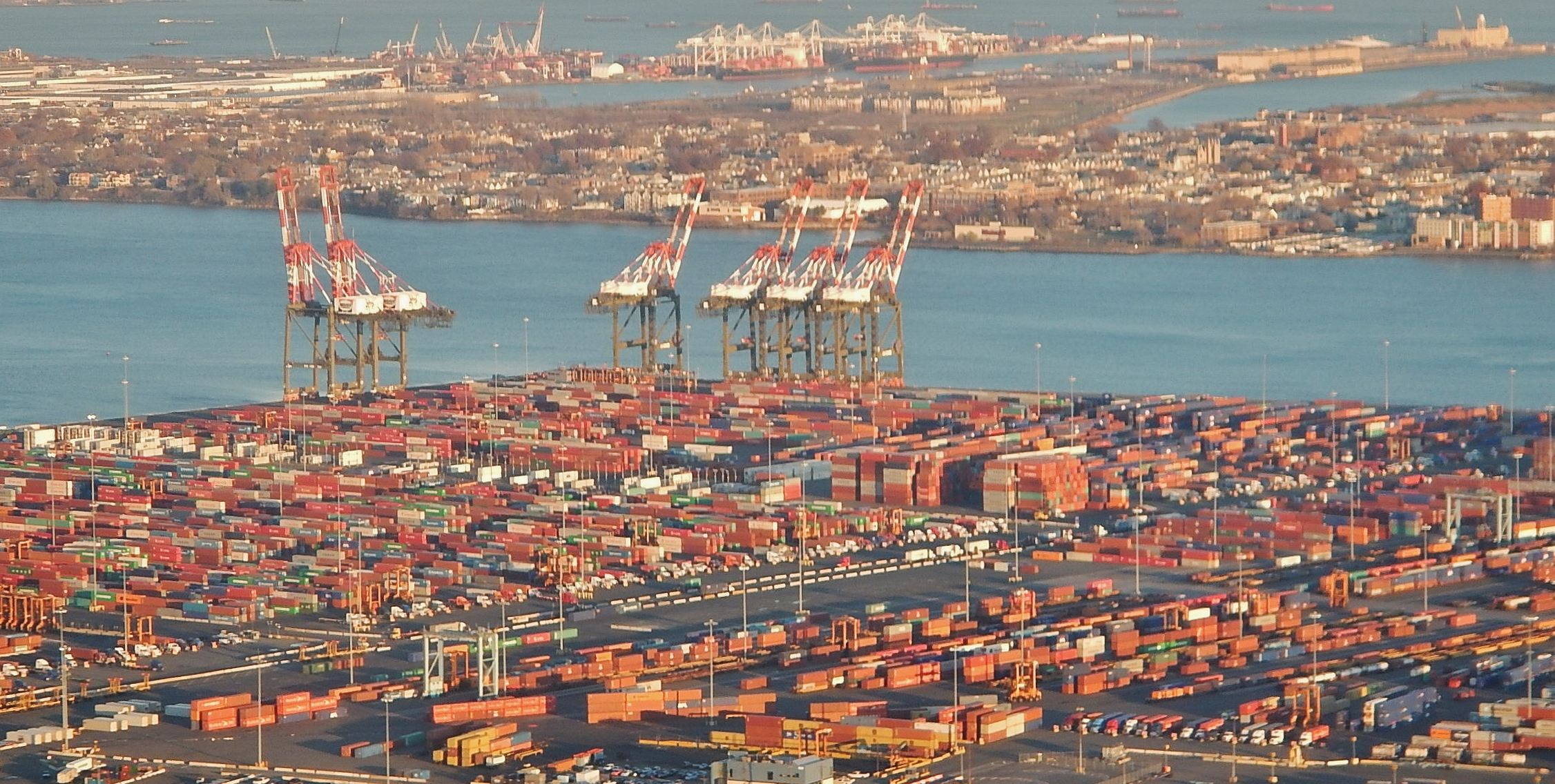
Port Newark on Newark Bay (foreground) and Port Jersey on Upper New York Bay

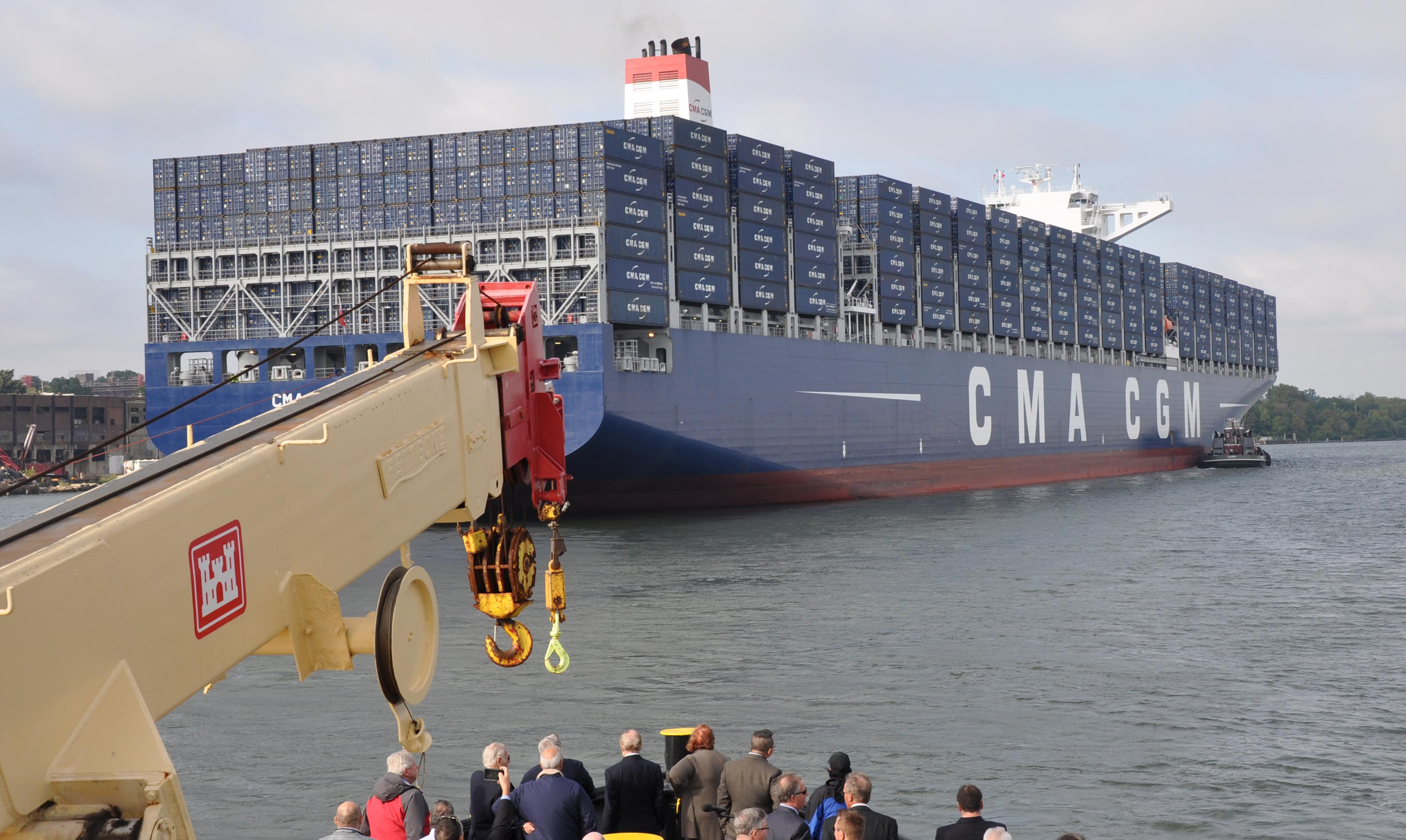
CMA CGM Theodore Roosevelt, the largest container ship to enter the port as of on Sept 7, 2017

There are four container terminals in the port:

- Howland Hook Marine Terminal
- Port Jersey Marine Terminal
- Port Newark-Elizabeth Marine Terminal
- Red Hook Marine Terminal

Terminals are leased to different port operators, such as A. P. Moller-Maersk Group, American Stevedoring, NYCT, and Global Marine Terminal.

In June 2010, the Port Authority of New York and New Jersey agreed to purchase from Bayonne 128 acres (0.52 km^{2}) of land at the Military Ocean Terminal at Bayonne, indicating that additional container port facilities would be created. The agency is expected to develop a terminal capable of handling the larger container ships that have entered service since the widened the Panama Canal opened in 2014, some of which would not have passed under the original Bayonne Bridge at the Kill van Kull. A project to raise to the roadway of the bridge within the existing arch was completed in May, 2019.

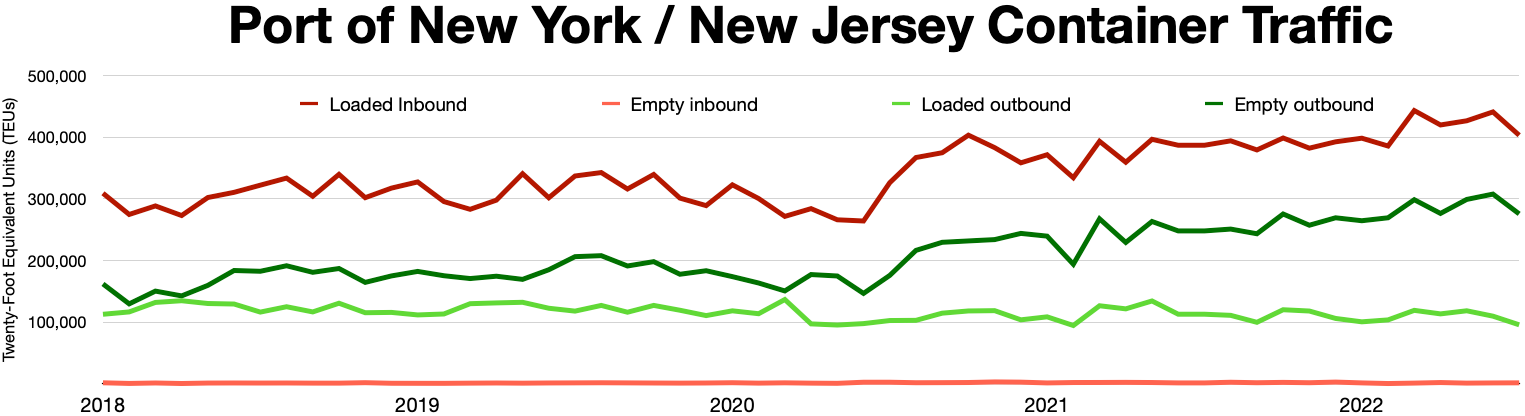
New York - New Jersey container port traffic Loaded Imports Empty Exports Loaded Exports Empty Imports

The terminal's combined volume makes it the largest on the East Coast, and the third busiest in the United States. In 2023, it handled a cargo volume of over 7.8 million TEUs, benefitting post-Panamax from the expansion of the Panama Canal. As of 2023, the terminals experienced a more severe reduction in cargo volume compared to California seaports, resulting in the Port of Los Angeles reclaiming its position as the nation's busiest.

=== ExpressRail ===
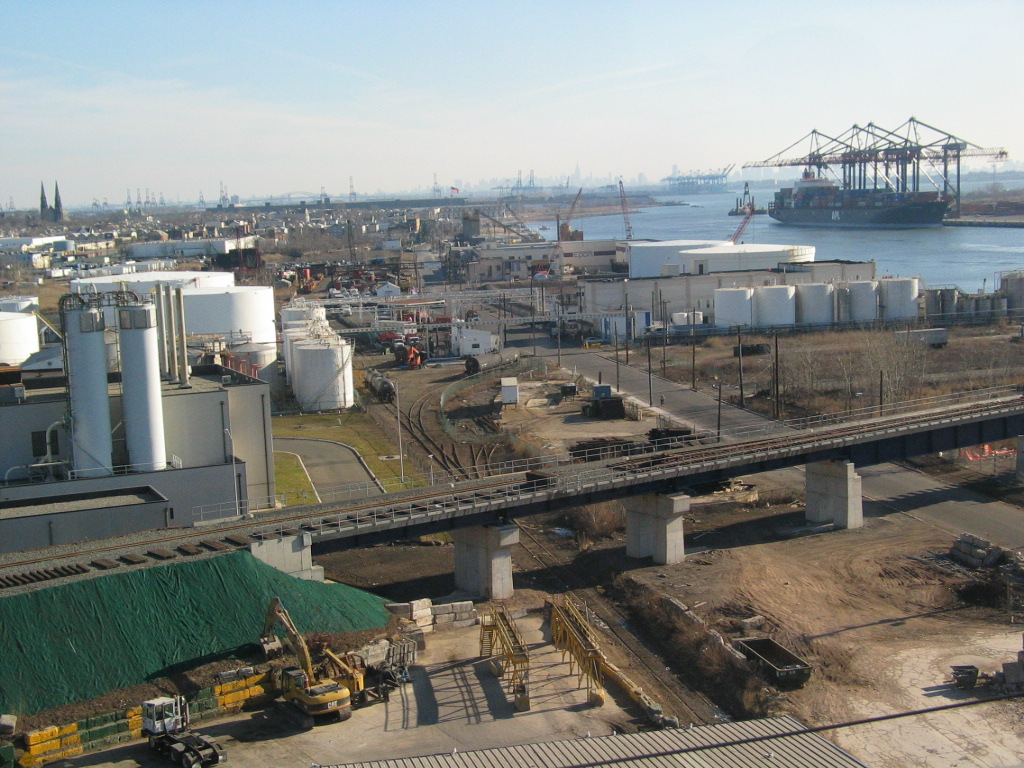
Along the Arthur Kill, the Staten Island Railway North Shore Branch line (foreground) connects the Howland Hook Marine Terminal to the Chemical Coast

ExpressRail is the rail network supporting intermodal freight transport at the major container terminals of the port. The development of dockside trackage and railyards for transloading has been overseen by the Port Authority of New York and New Jersey which works in partnership other public and private stakeholders. Various switching and terminal railroads, including the Conrail Shared Assets Operations (CRCX) on the Chemical Coast Secondary connect to the East Coast rail freight network carriers Norfolk Southern (NS), CSX Transportation (CSX), and Canadian Pacific (CP). The network is partially financed by a surcharge on all containers passing through the port by train or truck.

=== Bulk cargo and marine transfer ===
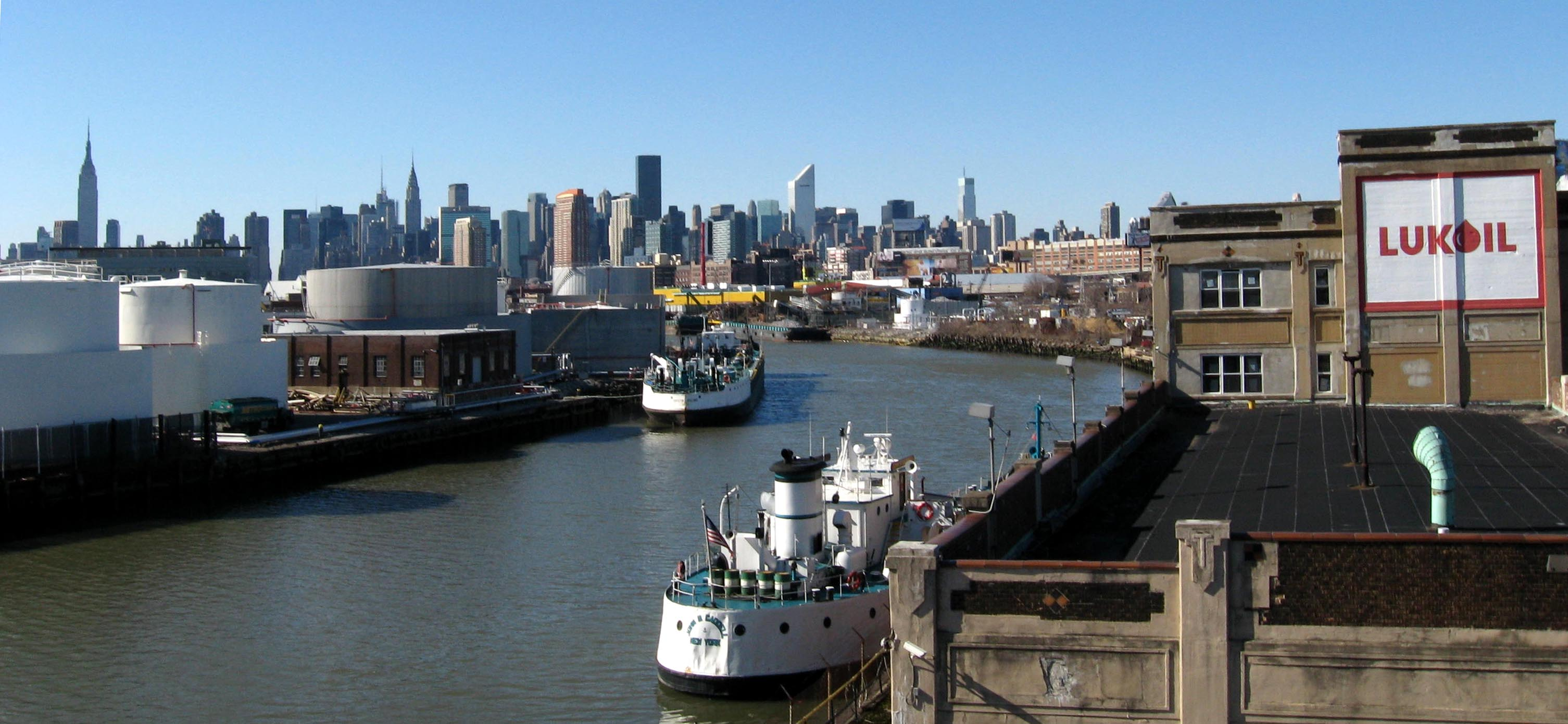
Newtown Creek

While most consumer goods are transported in containers, other commodities such as petroleum and scrap metal are handled at facilities for marine transfer operations, bulk cargo, and break bulk cargo throughout the port, many along its straits and canals. At some locations, water pollution has led to inclusion on the list of Superfund sites in the United States.

- Arthur Kill, along its shore the Bayway Refinery and the Chemical Coast
- Kill van Kull at Constable Hook
- Gowanus Canal in South Brooklyn
- Newtown Creek, East River at Greenpoint and Hunter's Point
- Passaic River from Newark Bay to Passaic
- South Brooklyn Marine Terminal

=== Car float and Cross-Harbor Rail Tunnel ===
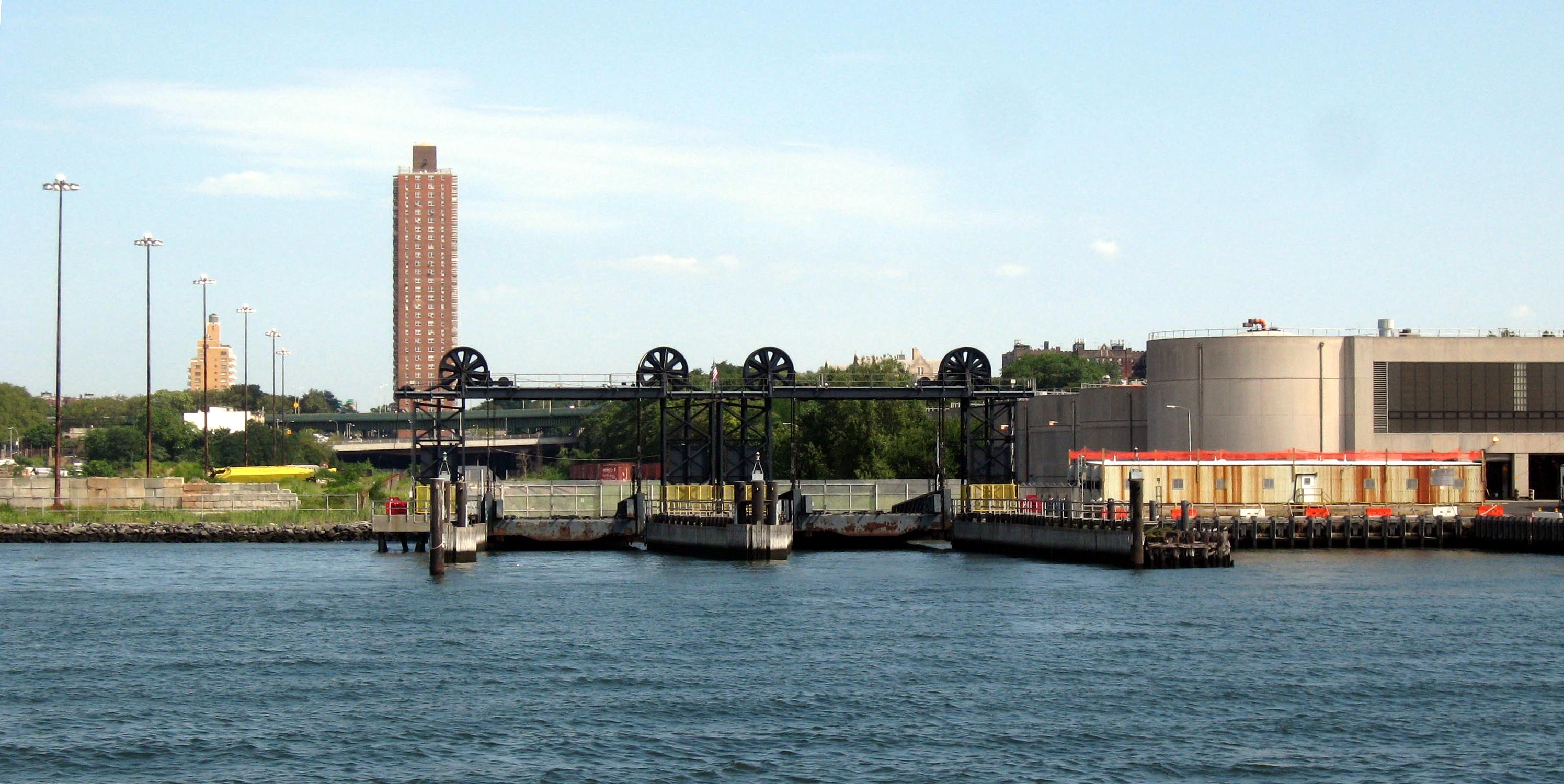
NYNJ Rail western end

At one time, nearly 600,000 railcars were transferred annually by barge between the region's extensive rail facilities. Today, approximately 1,600 cars are "floated" on the remaining car float in the port. The New York New Jersey Rail, LLC transfers freight cars across the Upper Bay between the Greenville Yard in Jersey City and the 65th Street Yard and the Bush Terminal Yard in Brooklyn.

At the Greenville end, CSX Transportation operates through Conrail's North Jersey Shared Assets Area along the National Docks Secondary. At Brooklyn, end connections are made to the New York and Atlantic Railway's Bay Ridge Branch and the South Brooklyn Railway. The 2.5-mile (4.0 km) crossing takes approximately 45 minutes. The equivalent truck trip would be 35 to 50 miles (80 km) long.

Freight rail has never used the New York Tunnel Extension under the Hudson Palisades, Hudson River, Manhattan, and East River due to electrified lines and lack of ventilation. Overland travel crosses the Hudson River 140 miles (225 km) to the north using a right of way known as the Selkirk hurdle.

The Cross-Harbor Rail Tunnel is a proposed rail tunnel under the Upper Bay. The western portal would be located at the Greenville Yard, while the eastern portal is undetermined and a source of controversy.

In May 2010, the Port Authority announced that it would purchase the Greenville Yard and build a new barge-to-rail facility there, as well as improve the existing railcar float system. The barge-to-rail facility is expected to handle an estimated 60,000 to 90,000 containers of solid waste per year from New York City, eliminating up to 360,000 trash truck trips a year. The authority's board authorized $118.1 million for the project. The National Docks Secondary rail line is being upgraded in anticipation of expanded volumes.

In September 2014, the PANYNJ announced a $356 million capital project to upgrade and expand the facility, including Roll-on/roll-off operations. Expected to be operational about July 2016, an initial capacity of at least 125,000 cargo container lifts a year is projected.

=== Port Inland Distribution Network ===
The Port Inland Distribution Network involves new or expanded transportation systems for redistribution by barge and rail for the shipped goods and containers that are delivered at area ports in an effort to curtail the use of trucks and their burden on the environment, traffic, and highway systems. The Port Authority of New York and New Jersey (PANYNJ), New Jersey Department of Transportation (NJDOT), and Delaware Valley Regional Planning Commission (DVRPC), are involved in initiatives to review and develop this network. To instantiate PIDN, the PANYNJ signed an agreement November 29, 2003 with the Port of Albany to provide twice weekly barge service. By 2014, the service had been discontinued.

In 2018, service between Newark and Brooklyn to Port of Davisville in Rhode Island was initiated.

=== America's Marine Highway ===
America's Marine Highway is a similar United States Department of Transportation initiative to capitalize on U.S. waterways for the transport of goods. In 2016, MARAD made a grant of $1.6 million to improve the terminal at Red Hook as part of the Marine Highway program. Barges carrying containers on a route between Red Hook and Newark began operation in September 2016.

In 2010, a private sector service provider began short sea shipping of aggregate products with a barge service between Tremley Point, Linden on the Arthur Kill and the Port of Salem to address a critical, yet weak link in freight transport with ports in the Philadelphia metropolitan area.

== Cruise terminals and ferries ==
=== Cruise terminals ===
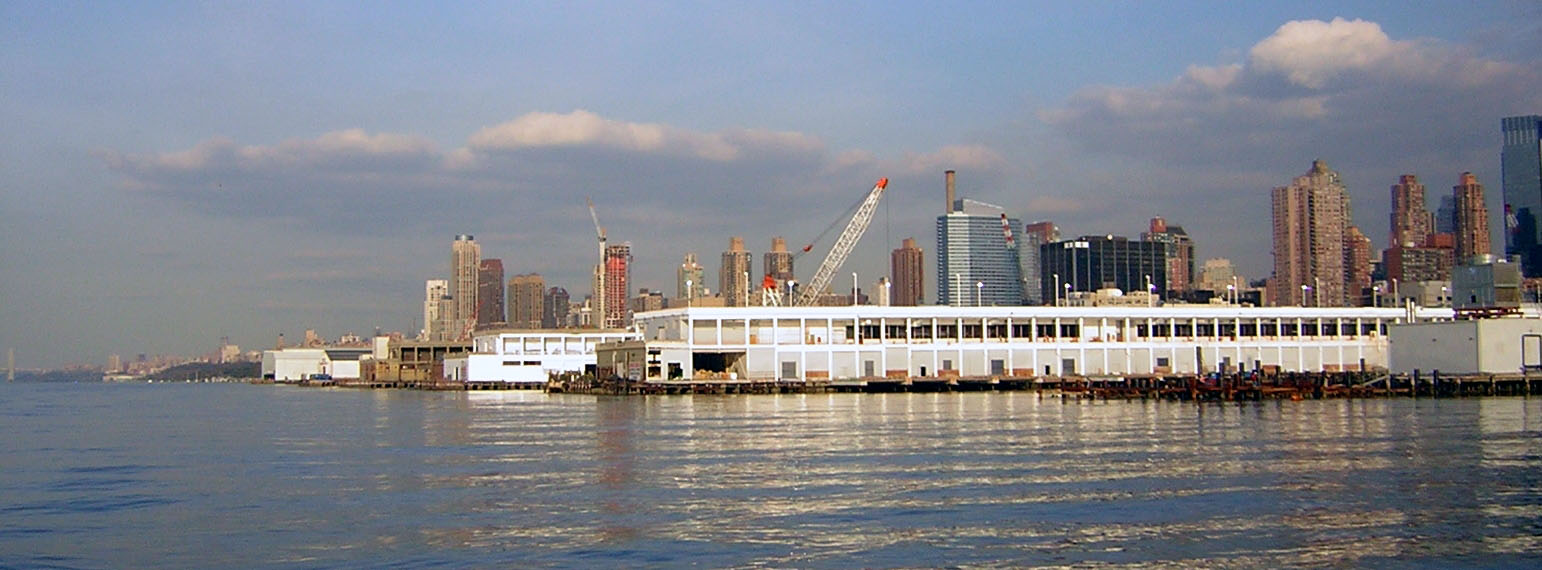
Cruise terminal on the Hudson

The golden age of the North Atlantic ocean liner lasted from the end of the 19th century to the post–World War II period, after which innovations in air travel became commercially viable. Many berths for the great ships that lined the North River (Hudson River) were more or less abandoned by the 1970s.

Nowadays most travel is recreational. While many cruises are to points in the Caribbean and to the Southern Hemisphere, there are also ships calling at the port that sail transatlantically, notably RMS Queen Mary 2 with a scheduled service to Southampton, England. The passenger cruise ship terminals in the port are located in the traditional, or "inner", harbor. Collectively the cruise terminals in the Port of New York and New Jersey are the sixth busiest in the United States and 16th busiest in the world for passenger travel.

- Cape Liberty Cruise Port, MOTBY, Upper Bay
- Brooklyn Cruise Terminal, Buttermilk Channel, Upper Bay
- New York Passenger Ship Terminal, Hudson River

=== Ferries and sightseeing ===
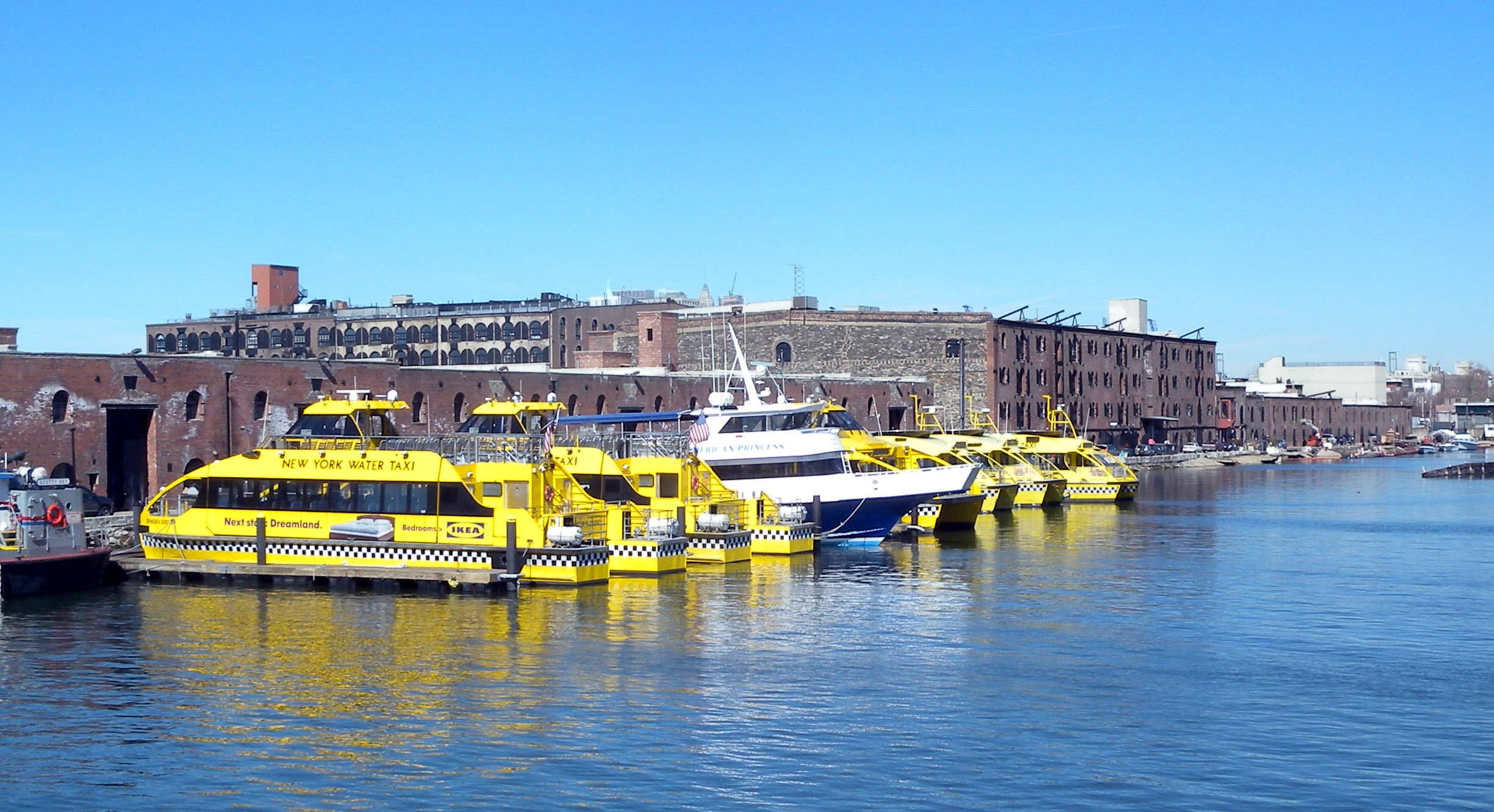
New York Water Taxi ferries moored at Erie Basin in Red Hook, Brooklyn

There has been continuous ferry service between Staten Island and Lower Manhattan since the 18th century. Travelling across the Upper Bay between South Ferry and St. George Ferry Terminal, the free Staten Island Ferry transports on average 75,000 passengers per day.

Service on the East River ended in the early 20th century and on the Hudson River in the 1960s. It has been restored and grown significantly since the 1980s providing regular service to points in Manhattan, mostly below 42nd Street. Major terminals are Hoboken Terminal, Battery Park City Ferry Terminal at World Financial Center, Paulus Hook Ferry Terminal, Weehawken Port Imperial, Pier 11/Wall Street, West Midtown Ferry Terminal, and the East 34th Street Ferry Landing. There also are numerous ferry slips that each serve one route only, including the historic Fulton Ferry. In addition to regular and rush hour routes, there are excursions, trips, and seasonal service to Gateway National Recreation Area beaches. Sightseeing boats circumnavigate Manhattan or make excursions into the Upper New York Bay.

- Circle Line Downtown
- Circle Line Sightseeing
- Ellis Island and Liberty Island
- Governor's Island Ferry (seasonal)
- Liberty Water Taxi
- New York Water Taxi
- NYC Ferry
- NY Waterway
- New York Beach Ferry
- SeaStreak
- Staten Island Ferry

== Lights and lighthouses ==
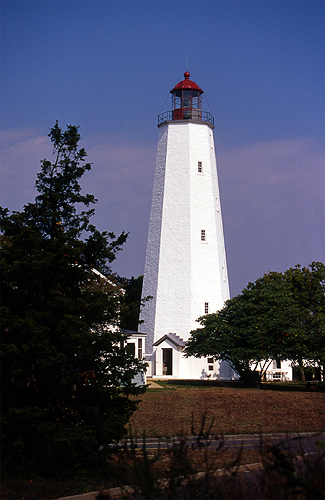
Sandy Hook Light, the oldest continuously operating and standing lighthouse in the United States

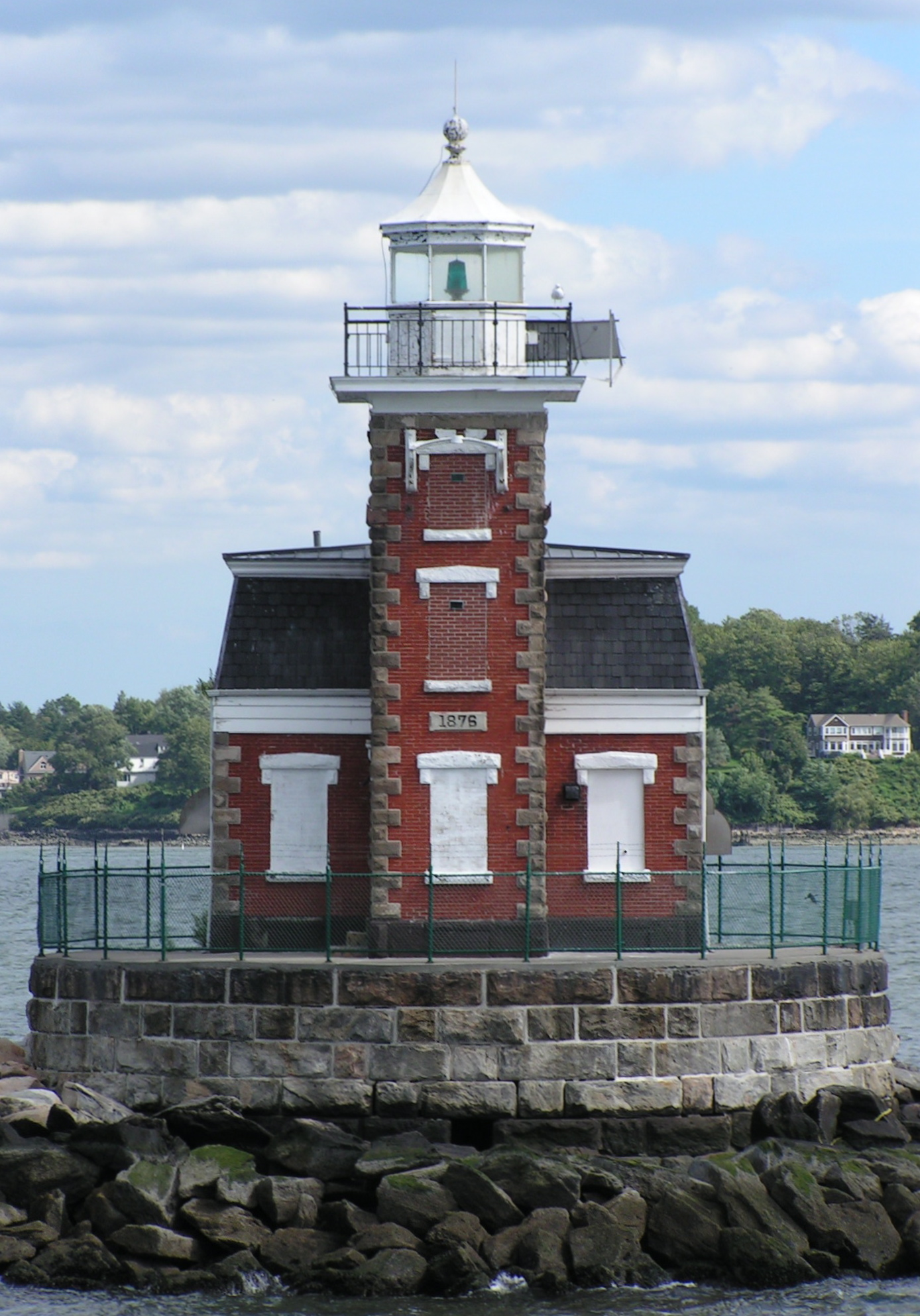
Stepping Stones Lighthouse

There are both historic and modern lighthouses throughout the port, some of which have been decommissioned

- Ambrose Light, Lower Bay (dismantled 2008)
- Bergen Point Light, Newark Bay (replaced)
- Blackwell Island Light, Roosevelt Island, East River (retired 1940)
- Chapel Hill Rear Range Light, Sandy Hook Bay (deactivated 1957)
- Conover Beacon (front range light), Leonardo
- Coney Island (Nortons Point) Light, Lower New York Bay, Sea Gate, Brooklyn
- Elm Tree Beacon Light, The Narrows, New Dorp, Staten Island
- Execution Rocks Light, Long Island Sound
- Fort Tompkins Light, The Narrows, Staten Island (retired)
- Fort Wadsworth Light, The Narrows, Brooklyn
- Great Beds Light, Raritan Bay, South Amboy
- Kings Point Light, Long Island Sound, Great Neck
- Kingsborough Community College Light, Sheepshead Bay, Brooklyn
- Little Gull Island Light, Long Island Sound
- Little Red Lighthouse (Jeffrey's Hook Lighthouse), Fort Washington, Manhattan
- Navesink Twin Lights, Sandy Hook Bay, Highlands
- New Dorp Light, The Narrows, Staten Island Swash Channel (retired)
- North Brother Island Light, East River
- Old Orchard Shoal Light, Gedney Channel, Lower Bay
- Princes Bay Light, Staten Island
- Robbins Reef Light, Constable Hook, Upper Bay
- Romer Shoal Light, Lower Bay near Sandy Hook Bay
- Sandy Hook Light, Sandy Hook
- Staten Island Light Lighthouse Hill, Staten Island
- Statue of Liberty, Liberty Island, Upper Bay (until 1902)
- Stepping Stones Light, Long Island Sound, near City Island
- Stony Point light, Hudson River
- Throgs Neck Light, Throggs Neck, East River (decommissioned)
- Titanic Memorial, South Street Seaport, East River
- West Bank Light, Ambrose Channel, Lower Bay (range front)
- Whitestone Point Light, Whitestone Point, southerly side of East River

== Land reclamation and ocean dumping ==
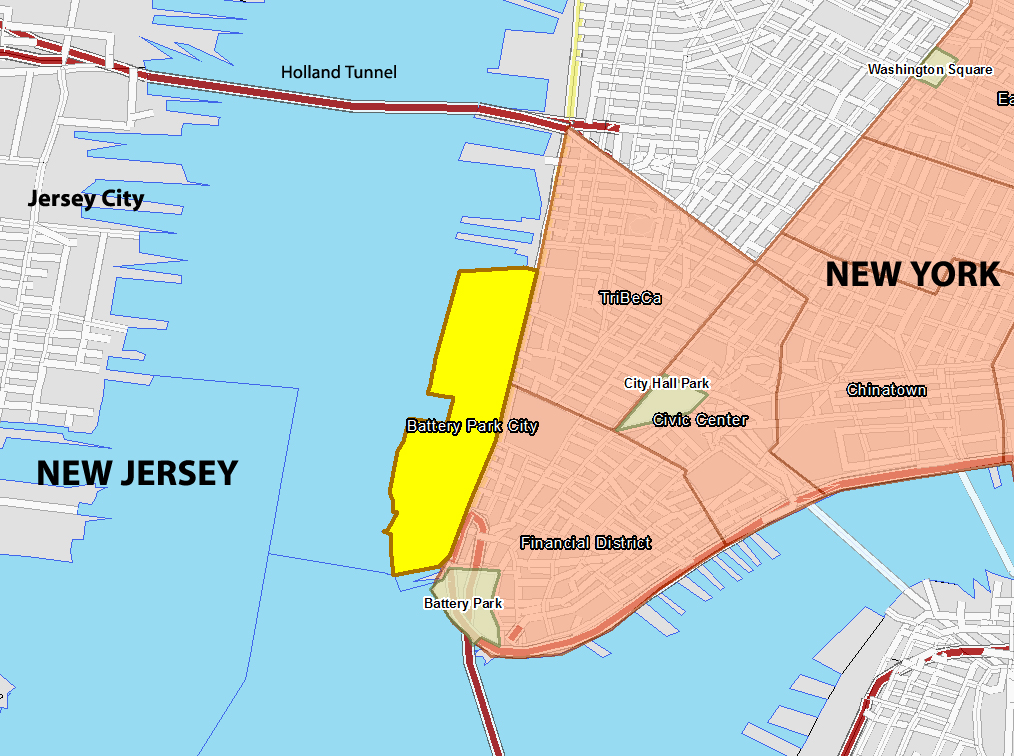
Battery Park City is one of many sites throughout the port built on land fill

Channelization and landfilling began in the colonial era and continued well into the 20th century. The expansion of the land area of Lower Manhattan through encroachment began in the 17th-century Dutch settlement of New Amsterdam and continued into 20th century.

Early materials were shellfish and other refuse, and later construction debris from projects such as the New York City Subway and Pennsylvania Station. Rubble from the bombing of London was transported for ballast during World War II. New land has been created throughout the port, including large swaths that are now Battery Park City, Ellis Island, Liberty State Park, Flushing Meadows–Corona Park, and the Meadowlands Sports Complex.

From 1924 until 1986, sewerage sludge was hauled by tugboat and barge to a point 12 miles (19 km) offshore in the Atlantic. From 1986 to 1992 it was dumped at a site 106 nautical miles from Atlantic City, after which ocean dumping was banned.

Barges were also used to transport waste to Fresh Kills Landfill, the world's largest, which operated from 1948 to 1991. Both operations were known to be detrimental to Long Island and Jersey Shore beaches, notably the 1987 Syringe Tide.

== Shipwrecks and abandoned boats ==
The port has many sunken ships, some of which can be seen, others that lie on the floor of the ports waterways.

The Staten Island boat graveyard is a marine scrapyard located in the Arthur Kill near the Fresh Kills Landfill, on the West Shore of Staten Island.

== Tourism and recreation ==
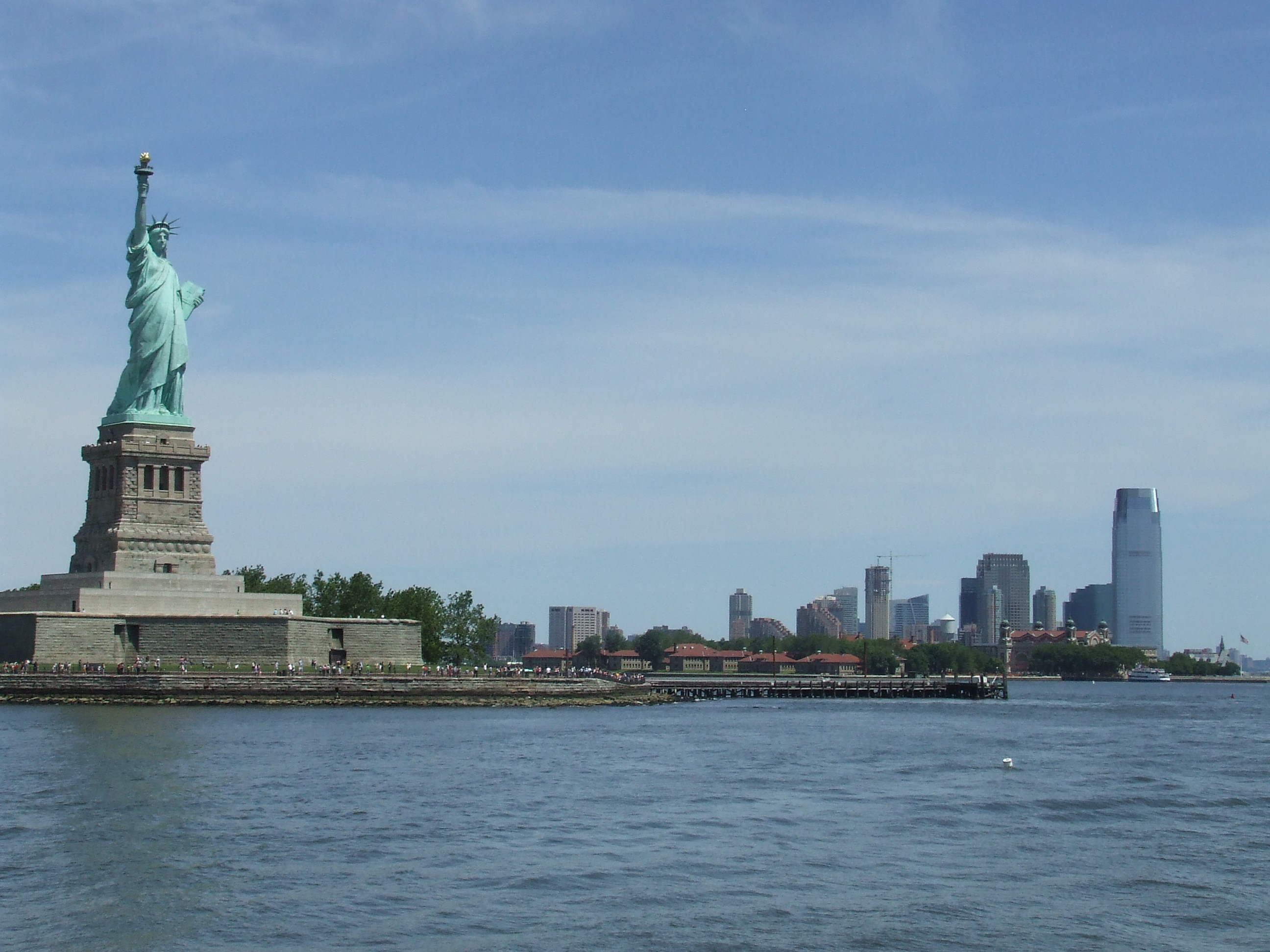
The Statue of Liberty and Ellis Island recall the era of transatlantic immigration to America

Harbor-related historic sites, promenades, and nature preserves within the port district include:

- South Street Seaport
- USS Intrepid Sea, Air & Space Museum (Pier 86)
- Gateway National Recreation Area
- Statue of Liberty National Monument, Ellis Island and Liberty Island and Governor's Island
- Hudson River Park, Hudson River Waterfront Walkway, Brooklyn Bridge Park
- Liberty State Park and Communipaw Terminal
- Battery Park and Castle Clinton
- Hackensack Meadowlands, Riverwalk, and Environment Center
- Pier 63, New York Central Railroad 69th Street Transfer Bridge, and 79th Street Boat Basin
- Gantry Plaza State Park
- Manhattan Waterfront Greenway
- Hoboken Terminal
- City Island

== Economy ==
In 2010, 4,811 ships entered the harbor carrying over 32.2 million metric tons of cargo valued at over $175 billion. In 2010, the New York-New Jersey Port industry supported:

1. 170,770 direct jobs
2. 279,200 total jobs in the NY-NJ region
3. Nearly $11.6 billion in personal income
4. Over $37.1 billion in business income
5. Almost $5.2 billion in federal, state and local tax revenues
6. Local and State Tax Revenue: $1.6 billion
7. Federal Tax Revenue: $3.6 billion

Approximately 3.2 million twenty-foot equivalent units (TEU) of containers and 700,000 automobiles are handled per year. In the first half of 2014, the port handled 1,583,449 containers, a 35,000-container increase above the six-month record set in 2012, while the port handled a monthly record of 306,805 containers in October 2014. In 2014, the port handled 3,342,286 containers and 393,931 automobiles.

In January through June 2015, the top 10 imports that went through the port of New York and New Jersey were:

1. Petroleum: $6.78 billion
2. Appliances: $3.80 billion
3. Vehicles: $2.59 billion
4. Plastics: $1.72 billion
5. Electronics: $1.46 billion
6. Chemicals: $1.45 billion
7. Oils and perfumes: $928.7 million
8. Pharmaceuticals: $897.5 million
9. Optical and photographic: $801.8 million
10. Pearls and precious gems and metals: $562.4 million

== See also ==
- List of bridges, tunnels, and cuts in Hudson County, New Jersey
- List of North American ports
- List of ports in the United States
- List of world's busiest container ports
- Collector of the Port of New York
- Marine life of New York-New Jersey Harbor Estuary
- New York Harbor Storm-Surge Barrier
- Port of Paulsboro
- Rail freight transportation in New York City and Long Island
- Timeline of Jersey City, New Jersey-area railroads
- United States container ports
- United States Custom House (New York City) – the custom house at the Port of New York and New Jersey
- Vision 2020: New York City Comprehensive Waterfront Plan
- Houseboats in New York City
