= Lower New York Bay =

Bay in New York and New Jersey, US

Coordinates: 40°31′00″N 74°02′59″W

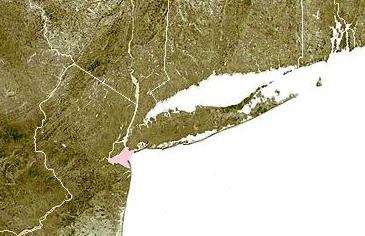
A 2004 map with Lower New York Bay highlighted in pink

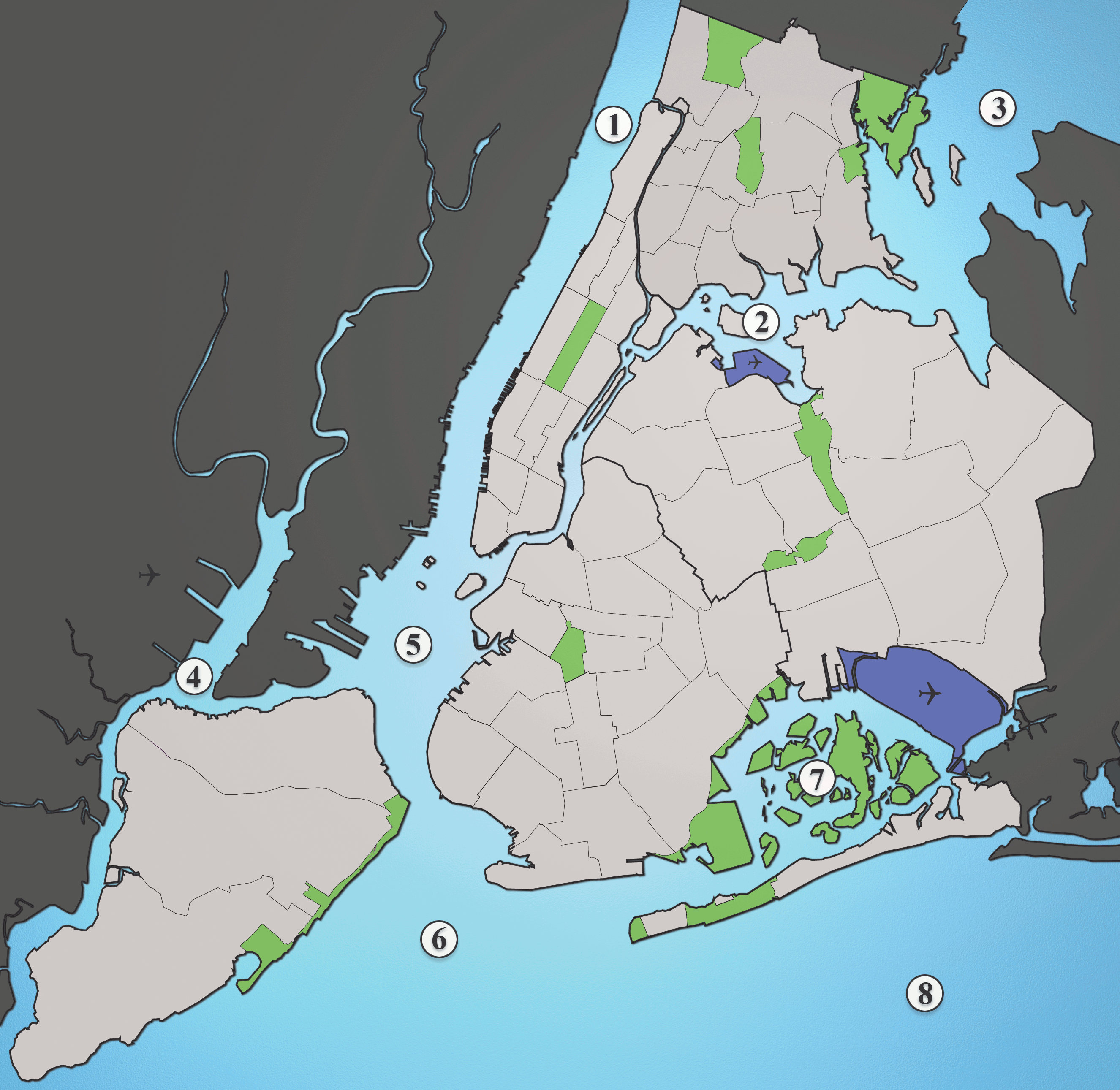
Hudson River estuary waterways: 1. Hudson River, 2. East River, 3. Long Island Sound, 4. Newark Bay, 5. Upper New York Bay, 6. Lower New York Bay, 7. Jamaica Bay, 8. New York Bight (Atlantic Ocean)

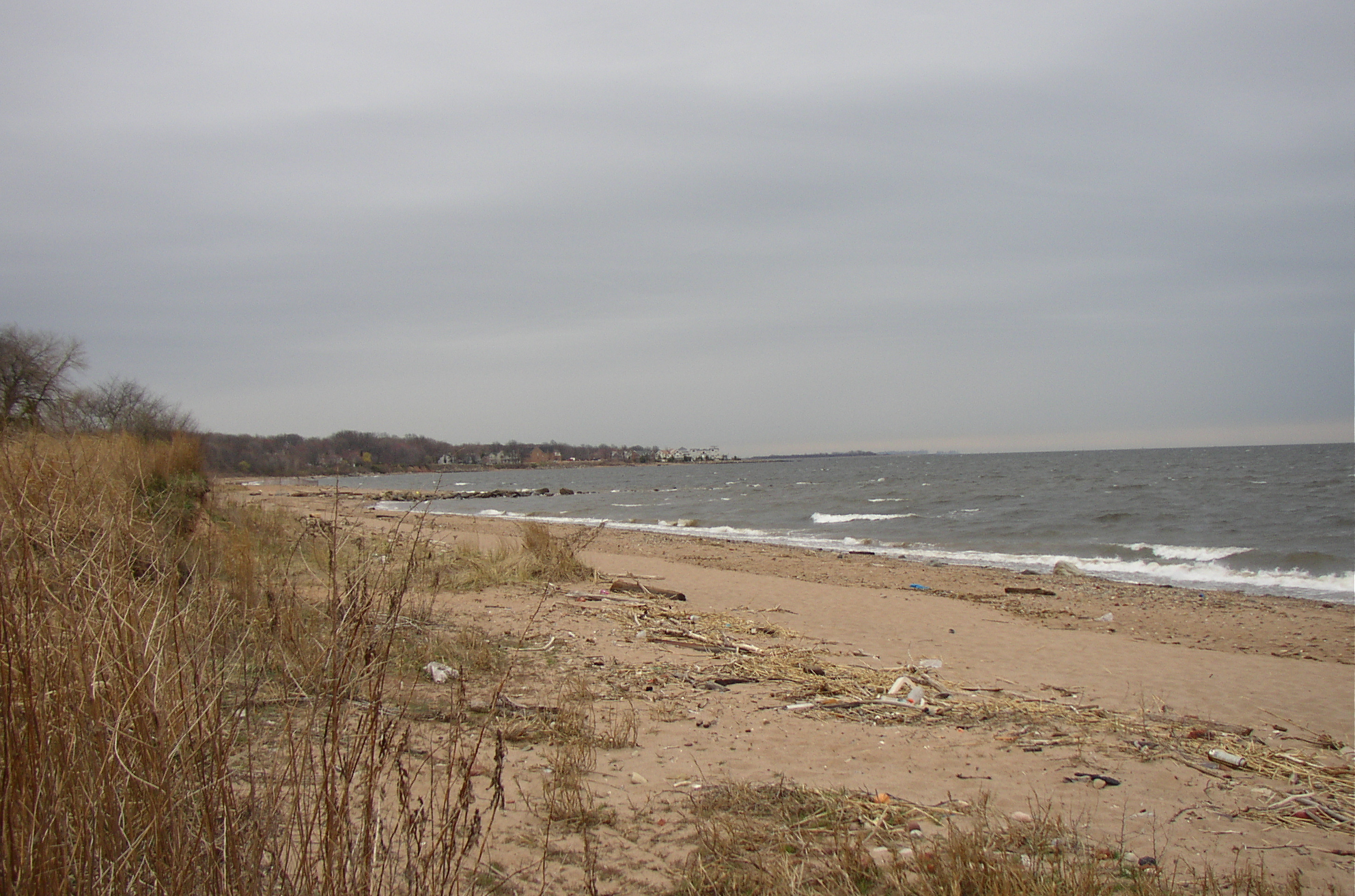
View over the Lower New York Bay from Wolfe's Pond Park on Staten Island, New York

View over the Raritan Bay from Sandy Hook, New Jersey

Lower New York Bay is a section of New York Bay south of the Narrows (the strait between Staten Island and Brooklyn). The eastern end of the Bay is marked by two spits of land, Sandy Hook, New Jersey, and Rockaway, Queens. The waterway between the spits connects the Bay to the Atlantic Ocean at the New York Bight. Traversing the floor of the Bay southeasterly from the Narrows to the Bight and beyond is Hudson Canyon.

Roughly the northeastern portion of the Bay from the Narrows to Sandy Hook is known as the Lower Bay (named in relation to the neighboring Upper New York Bay); roughly the western portion of the Bay (including the portion at the mouth of New Jersey's Raritan River) is called Raritan Bay; and roughly the southeastern portion of the Bay (that is, the portion south and the portion southwest from Sandy Hook) is known as Sandy Hook Bay.

== History and geography ==
Since before the time of the Lenape, the Native American inhabitants of the area, the Lower Bay has sustained a rich marine ecosystem with multiple fish species and molluscs, especially oyster, clam and mussel beds.

Captain Parker writes 5 December 1775, John Hetherington supposed Master of the Black Joke and another Pilot were employed with their boats at twenty shillings a day to stop up the narrowest part of the channel between the East and West Banks did their soundings etc. last Friday and Saturday and that the materials for this are being prepared on Staten Island - Hetherington is now on HMS Asia

In the 20th century, due to increased population and industrial pollution, the water quality of the bay and its ability to support marine life was severely diminished. The water quality of the bay began to improve with the passage of the 1972 Clean Water Act.

The main shipping channel through Lower New York Bay is the Ambrose Channel, 2,000 feet (600 meters) wide and dredged to a depth of 40 feet (12 meters). The channel is navigable by ships with up to a 37-foot draft at low tide. The entrance to the Ambrose Channel was marked for many years by the Lightship Ambrose, which was superseded by the Ambrose Light.

The bay contains popular beaches at Brighton Beach and Coney Island in Brooklyn. There are also beaches on Staten Island. Just outside the bay, facing the Atlantic, are the beaches of Sandy Hook and the Rockaways.

=== Lighthouses ===
Several lighthouses were built to aid navigation in and around Lower New York Bay, located both on land and in the bay itself. The earliest, at Sandy Hook, was built in colonial times.

In New Jersey:

- Chapel Hill Rear Range Light
- Conover Beacon
- Great Beds Light
- Navesink Twin Lights
- Sandy Hook Light

In New York:

- Coney Island Light
- New Dorp Light
- Princes Bay Light
- Staten Island Light
- Fort Wadsworth Light

Within Lower New York Bay:

- Romer Shoal Light
- West Bank Light
- Old Orchard Shoal Light

=== Islands ===
There are two small artificial islands in Lower New York Bay, both located a mile offshore from South Beach, Staten Island.

- Hoffman Island was created in 1873 from Orchard Shoals. It was named for former New York City mayor (1866–1868) and then-current New York Governor (1869–1871) John T. Hoffman. Hoffman Island covers 11 acres (4.45 hectares).
- Swinburne Island, with an area of about 4 acres (16,000 m^{2}), lies immediately to the south. Swinburne Island was originally called Dix Island, but was renamed in honor of Dr. John Swinburne, a noted military surgeon during the Civil War.

In the early 20th century, both islands were used as a quarantine station, housing immigrants found to have been carrying contagious diseases when they landed at Ellis Island. At the start of World War II the United States Merchant Marine used both islands as a training station (which opened in 1938); the Quonset huts built during this period still stand on Swinburne Island.

The other major use for the two islands during World War II were as anchorages for antisubmarine nets that fenced off New York Bay from the Atlantic Ocean to keep enemy submarines out. Both islands are now part of Gateway National Recreation Area.

Fort Lafayette was on a small island in the Narrows, just off the Brooklyn shore. That island was removed during construction of the Verrazzano–Narrows Bridge. Coney Island, originally separated from the southern shore of Brooklyn by a narrow strait, has since been connected to the main part of Long Island by landfill, and is now a peninsula despite its name.

== See also ==
- Upper New York Bay
- Raritan Bay
- Long Island Sound
- Hudson River
- Raritan River
- Arthur Kill
- Geography of New York-New Jersey Harbor Estuary
- Port of New York and New Jersey
- New York Harbor
- New York Harbor Storm-Surge Barrier
