= Elm Tree Beacon Light =

Lighthouse in Staten Island, New York

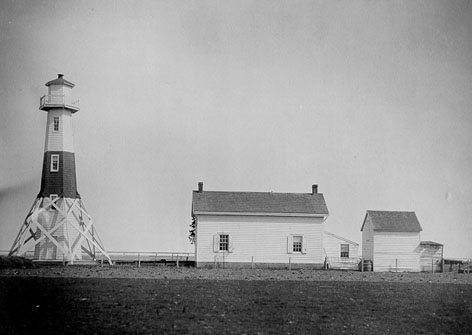
- Elm Tree Beacon Lighthouse
- Location: Staten Island / Lower New York Bay
- Coordinates: 40°33′50″N 74°5′43″W

Tower
- Constructed: 1856
- Foundation: Brick
- Construction: 1856: Wood, 1939: Concrete
- Height: 59 feet (18 m)
- Shape: Square Cylindrical
- Markings: 1856: painted in bands, two white and one red, red roof on lantern, 1939: Natural

Light
- First lit: 1856
- Deactivated: 1964
- Characteristic: Fixed White - visible on Range line only

Elm Tree Beacon Light served as the front range with New Dorp Light as the rear to mark Swash Channel. The channel is now marked by Staten Island Light and West Bank Light.

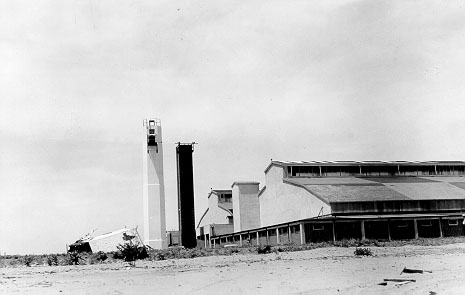
Elm Tree Beacon Light, Rebuilt in 1939
