= Great Beds Light =

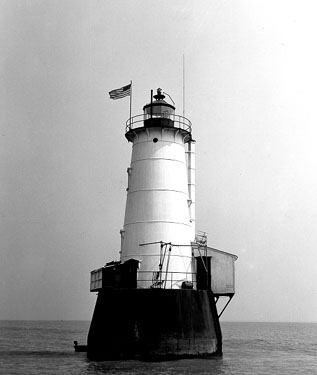
- Great Beds Light
- Location: Raritan Bay, South Amboy, New Jersey
- Coordinates: 40°29′12″N 74°15′12″W

Tower
- Constructed: 1880
- Foundation: Caisson
- Construction: Cast iron
- Automated: 1945
- Height: 61 feet (19 m)
- Shape: White conical tower on black conical pier with black lantern
- Heritage: National Register of Historic Places listed place

Light
- First lit: 1880
- Focal height: 19 m (62 ft)
- Lens: Fourth order Fresnel 1880
- Range: 6 nautical miles (11 km; 6.9 mi)
- Characteristic: Flashing red, 6 s
- Great Beds Light Station
- U.S. National Register of Historic Places
- New Jersey Register of Historic Places
- Architectural style: US Lighthouse Board
- MPS: Light Stations of the United States
- NRHP reference No.: 08000467
- NJRHP No.: 4106

Significant dates
- Added to NRHP: May 29, 2008
- Designated NJRHP: March 6, 2008

Great Beds Light is a sparkplug lighthouse in Raritan Bay, about 1 mile (1.6 km) from South Amboy of Middlesex County, New Jersey, United States. Over the years the lighthouse has become the symbol for the city of South Amboy. Named as Great Beds Light Station, it was added to the National Register of Historic Places on May 29, 2008, for its significance in architecture, engineering, transportation, and maritime history.

== History and description ==
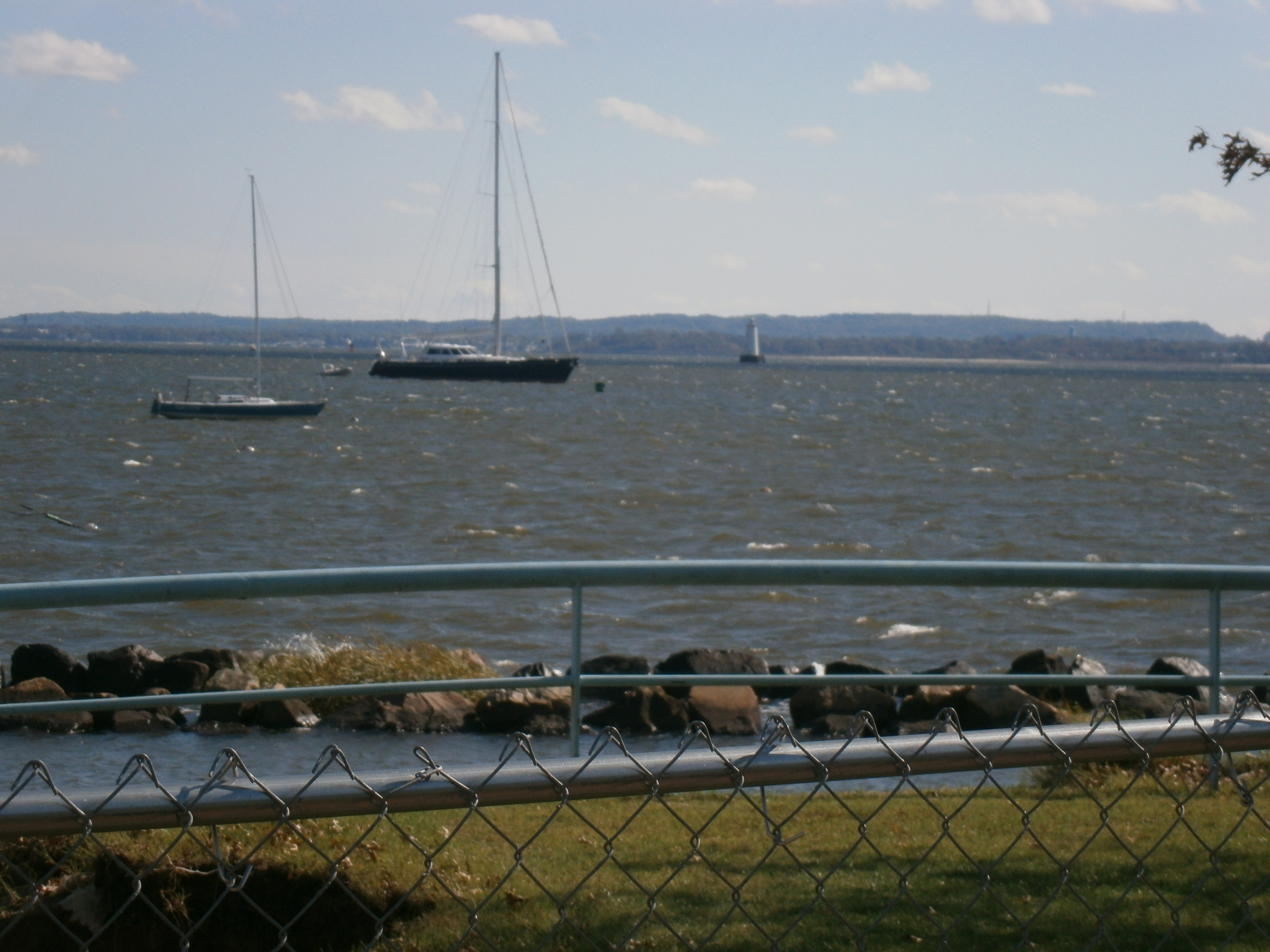
Perth Amboy waterfront with view to lighthouse

The light was built in 1880 with a fourth order Fresnel lens to mark the Great Beds Shoal, hazardous shallow water in the Raritan Bay. The 30-foot (9.1 m) foundation, a conical caisson, sits in about 11 feet (3.4 m) of water. The five-story tower and lantern are 47 feet (14 m) high.

== Lighthouses of Raritan Bay ==
- Chapel Hill Rear Range Light, Sandy Hook Bay (deactivated 1957)
- Conover Beacon, Leonardo
- Navesink Twin Lights, Highlands
- Sandy Hook Lighthouse, Sandy Hook

== See also ==
- National Register of Historic Places listings in Middlesex County, New Jersey
- List of the oldest buildings in New Jersey
- Geography of New York-New Jersey Harbor Estuary
- Raritan Bayshore
