= Staten Island Light =

Lighthouse in Staten Island, New York

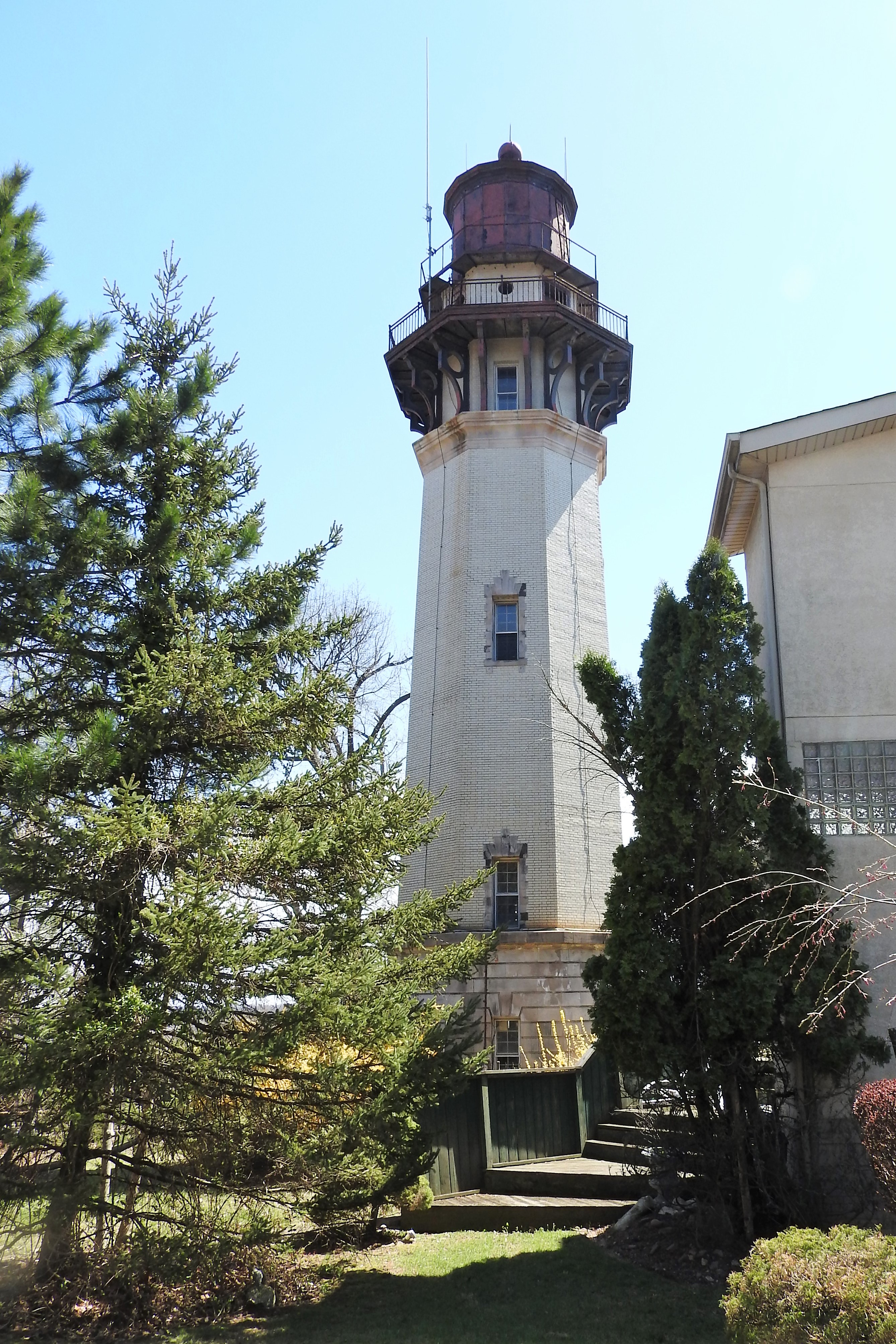
- Location: New York City
- Coordinates: 40°34′33.8″N 74°08′28.5″W

Tower
- Constructed: 1912
- Foundation: Grey limestone
- Construction: Yellow Brick
- Height: 90 feet (27 m)
- Shape: Octagonal
- Markings: Natural
- Heritage: National Register of Historic Places listed place, New York City Landmark

Light
- First lit: 1912
- Focal height: 231 feet (70 m)
- Lens: Second Order Fresnel lens
- Range: 18 nautical miles (33 km; 21 mi)
- Characteristic: Fixed White (F W) (lit 24 hours, visible only on range)
- Staten Island Light
- U.S. National Register of Historic Places
- New York City Landmark
- Location: S side of Edinboro Rd., bet. 402 and 426, Richmond County, New York
- Area: less than one acre
- MPS: Light Stations of the United States MPS
- NRHP reference No.: 05001340
- NYCL No.: 0367

Significant dates
- Added to NRHP: November 30, 2005
- Designated NYCL: January 17, 1968

The Staten Island Range Light, also known as the Ambrose Channel Range Light, is a lighthouse on Richmond Hill (Lighthouse Hill) in Staten Island, New York, United States. It is the rear range light companion to the West Bank Lighthouse. Built in 1912, the 90-foot tower sits more than five miles northwest of the West Bank Lighthouse, 141 feet above sea level. It shows a fixed white light that can be seen for 18 miles, by all vessels bound to the Port of New York and New Jersey coming in from the Atlantic Ocean (on range only).

The original hardware, including the second magnitude Fresnel lens and glass reflector, remain in place. However, the original mineral oil-burning lamp has since been replaced with a 1000 watt General Electric-manufactured Airway Signal incandescent lamp, with the backup light, which automatically turns on in the event of primary lamp failure, being the same. Many lighthouses have transitioned to LED systems, but this legacy equipment remains in use at this light.

The Staten Island Range Light also has a second light, the Swash Channel Rear Light. This light is also a steady white light beacon, and shines continuously 24 hours a day. The Swash Channel is not a major shipping lane like the Ambrose Channel. Rather, it is akin to a "secondary road," connecting the Ambrose Channel with the Sandy Hook Channel. This secondary light is not within the lantern room, as is the main light, the Rear Ambrose Channel Light.

Both the Ambrose Channel Light, as well as the Swash Channel Light, have backup lights independent from each of the main lighting systems (and the main systems' backup lamps). Neither light blinks or rotates, and each is only visible on range. Additionally, the Staten Island Range Light may be powered by banks of on-site batteries in the event of power failure.

It was designated a New York City Landmark in 1968 and remains a valuable aid to navigation for ships entering the Ambrose Channel in Lower New York Bay. It was listed on the National Register of Historic Places in 2005.

== See also ==
- List of New York City Designated Landmarks in Staten Island
- National Register of Historic Places listings in Richmond County, New York
