= Chapel Hill Rear Range Light =

Lighthouse in New Jersey, United States

- Location: south of Leonardo, New Jersey
- Coordinates: 40.3983°N 74.0587°W

Tower
- Construction: Wood (orig.)
- Height: 55 ft (orig.); 45 ft (current)
- Shape: rectangular house with central tower

Light
- First lit: 1856
- Deactivated: 1957

The Chapel Hill Rear Range Light is a lighthouse located off of Middletown Township in Monmouth County, New Jersey, United States, which functioned as the rear light of the now-discontinued Chapel Hill Range.

== History ==
This light was one of three identical lighthouses built along the New York harbor approaches in the 1850s (the others being the New Dorp Light and the Point Comfort Light). It worked in concert with the Conover Beacon to mark the Chapel Hill Channel, which runs north–south between the main Ambrose Channel and the secondary channel into Raritan Bay. The light took its name from a Baptist church built in 1809.

In 1957, this light was discontinued and replaced by a steel tower much closer to the front light (200 ft, as opposed to 1.5 mi (2.4 km) for the original lights). The old house was auctioned off in 1959 and sold to a New York businessman who intended it as a present for his amateur astronomer son. The building has since had several owners, who put an addition on the east end, added dormers along the roof line, and added various decorative touches.

== See also ==
- Conover Beacon
