= Romer Shoal Light =

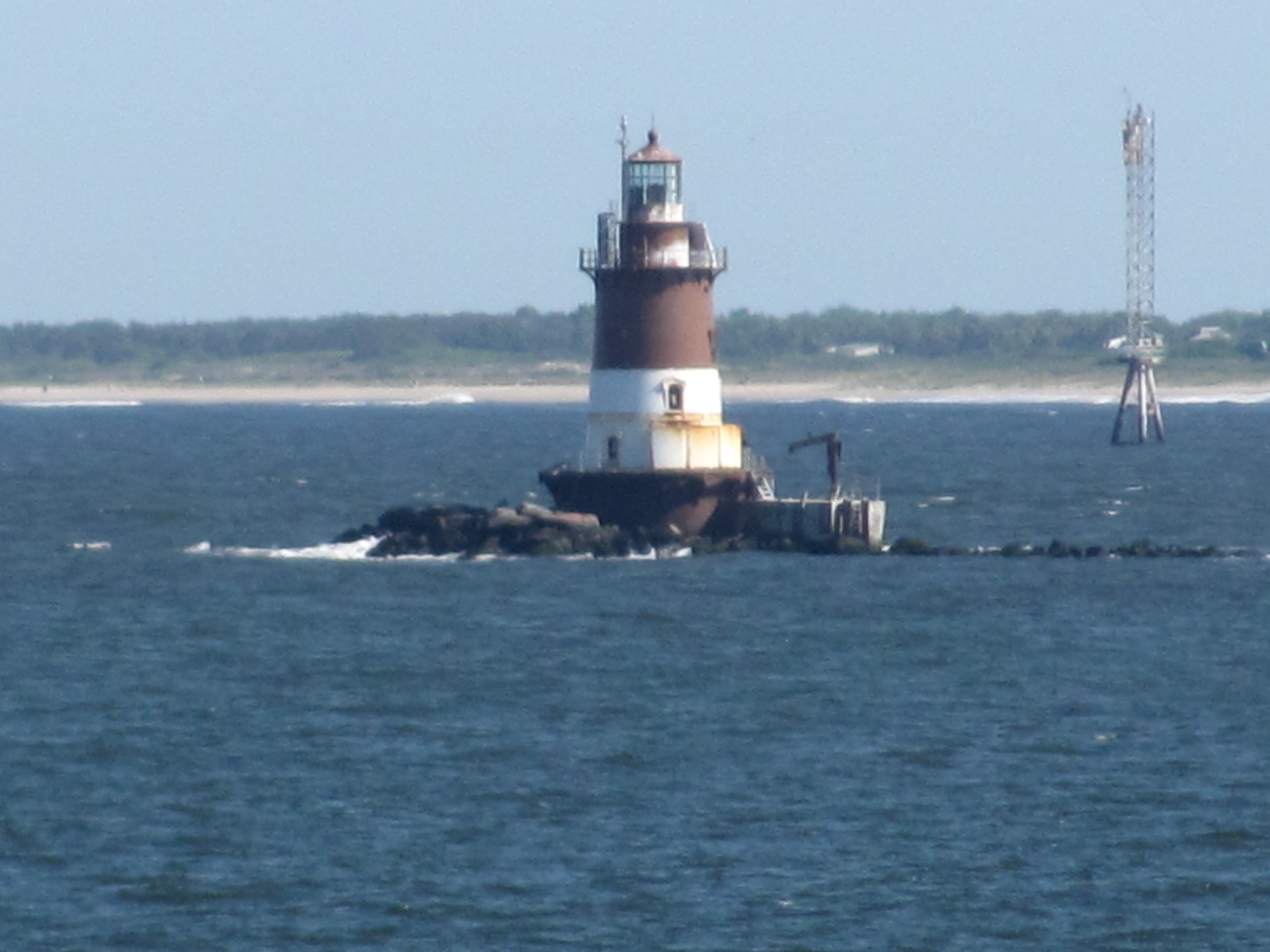
- Location: South of Ambrose Channel, New York Harbor
- Coordinates: 40°30′46.823″N 74°0′48.672″W

Tower
- Constructed: 1838
- Foundation: Concrete / cast iron caisson
- Construction: Cast iron
- Automated: 1966
- Height: 54 feet (16 m)
- Shape: Frustum of a cone -- sparkplug
- Markings: White bottom, red top including lantern
- Heritage: National Register of Historic Places listed place
- Fog signal: Horn: 2 every 30 s

Light
- First lit: 1898 (current tower)
- Focal height: 54 feet (16 m)
- Lens: Fourth-order Fresnel lens (original), 7.5 inches (190 mm) (current)
- Range: 15 nautical miles (28 km; 17 mi)
- Characteristic: Flashing white twice 15 s
- Romer Shoal Light Station
- U.S. National Register of Historic Places
- New Jersey Register of Historic Places
- Nearest city: Highlands, New Jersey
- Area: less than one acre
- Built: 1898
- Architect: U.S. Lighthouse Board
- MPS: Light Stations of the United States MPS
- NRHP reference No.: 06001304
- NJRHP No.: 3713

Significant dates
- Added to NRHP: January 24, 2007
- Designated NJRHP: August 16, 2006

Romer Shoal Light is a sparkplug lighthouse in Lower New York Bay, on the north edge of the Swash Channel, about 3/4 nautical mile (1.4 km; 0.86 mi) south of Ambrose Channel and 2 1/2 nautical miles (4.6 km; 2.9 mi) north of Sandy Hook, New Jersey, in the entrance to New York Harbor. It is in New Jersey, very close to the border with New York. Named as Romer Shoal Light Station, it was added to the National Register of Historic Places on January 24, 2007, for its significance in architecture, engineering, transportation, and maritime history.

== History and description ==
An 1870 edition of The Historical Magazine records that the shoal was named after Colonel Wolfgang William Romer, who sounded the waters of New York Bay in 1700 on order of the governor of New York. https://www.lighthousefriends.com/light.asp?ID=655

The Light was heavily damaged during Hurricane Sandy. The non-profit that has taken over stewardship of the Light is working with FEMA and private donors to preserve this national landmark.

== See also ==
- National Register of Historic Places listings in Monmouth County, New Jersey
