= Conover Beacon =

Lighthouse in New Jersey, United States

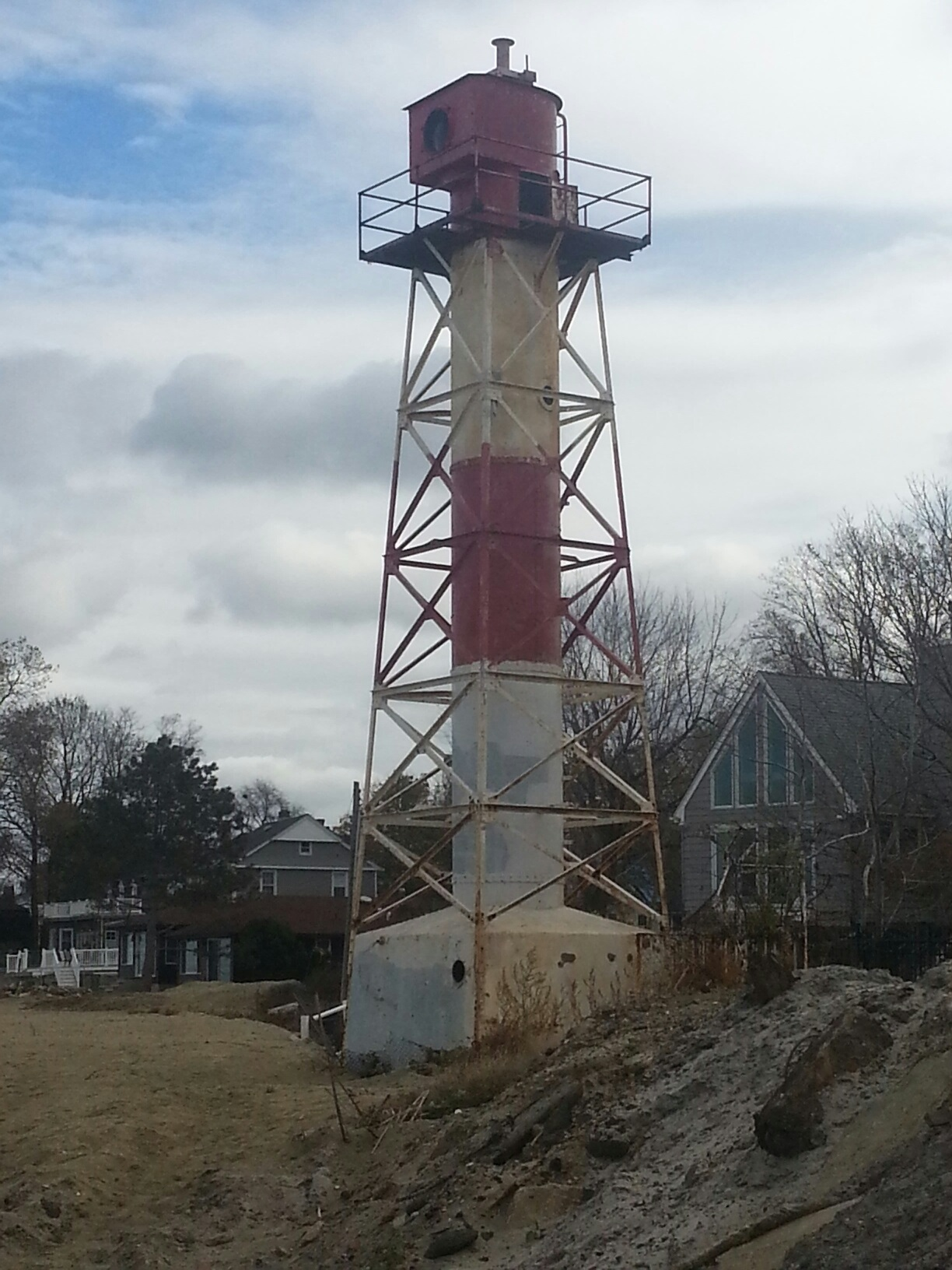
- Conover Beacon
- Location: Leonardo, New Jersey
- Coordinates: 40.4213°N 74.0556°W

Tower
- Construction: Wood (orig.); Steel (current)
- Height: 55 ft (orig.); 45 ft (current)
- Shape: hexagonal (orig.) skeletal w/cylinder (current)

Light
- First lit: 1856 (orig.); 1941 (current)
- Deactivated: 1988

The Conover Beacon is a lighthouse in Leonardo section of Middletown Township, Monmouth County, New Jersey, United States, that functioned as the front light of the now-discontinued Chapel Hill Range.

== History ==
The Chapel Hill Channel provides a north-south connection between the Ambrose Channel (the main channel into the Narrows) and Sandy Hook Channel, which continues west into Raritan Bay. This channel was marked, beginning in 1856, by range lights, named after the hill on which the original rear light stands. The original front beacon was a hexagonal wooden tower built at the edge of the beach in Leonardo, New Jersey. The land on which the light stood was purchased from Rulif Conover, who thus lent his name to the finished beacon.

The original tower stood until 1941, though the light was discontinued for several months in 1923, only to be restored after protests. In 1941 the front range tower from the Waackaack Range was moved to a spot adjacent to the old tower, and it served as the front light for the range until discontinuance in 1988. This skeletal tower with a central shaft remains in place, and is managed by Middletown Township, New Jersey. Both the old and the new towers used the same daymark: a red band on a white tower.

== See also ==
- Chapel Hill Rear Range Light
