= Old Orchard Shoal Light =

Lighthouse in Staten Island, New York

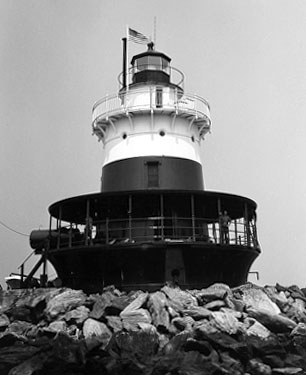
- Lighthouse at Old Orchard Shoal
- Location: New York City, United States
- Coordinates: 40°30′44.272″N 74°5′55.369″W

Tower
- Constructed: April 5, 1893
- Foundation: Concrete/Cast Iron Caisson
- Construction: Cast iron
- Automated: 1955
- Height: 35 feet (11 m)
- Shape: Conical "Spark Plug"
- Markings: Lower half brown, upper half white, on black pier
- Heritage: National Register of Historic Places listed place
- Fog signal: Air siren and horn

Light
- First lit: April 5, 1893
- Deactivated: October 29, 2012 (destroyed)
- Focal height: 51 feet (16 m)
- Lens: Fourth Order Fresnel lens (original), 9.8 inches (250 mm)
- Range: W 7 nautical miles (13 km; 8.1 mi); R 5 nautical miles (9.3 km; 5.8 mi)
- Characteristic: Fl W 6s
- Orchard Shoal Light Station, Old
- U.S. National Register of Historic Places
- Nearest city: Staten Island, New York
- Area: less than one acre
- Architect: US Lighthouse Board
- NRHP reference No.: 06000864
- Added to NRHP: September 20, 2006

Old Orchard Shoal Light was a sparkplug lighthouse in Lower New York Bay marking a large shoal area. It was destroyed by Hurricane Sandy on October 29, 2012.

== History ==
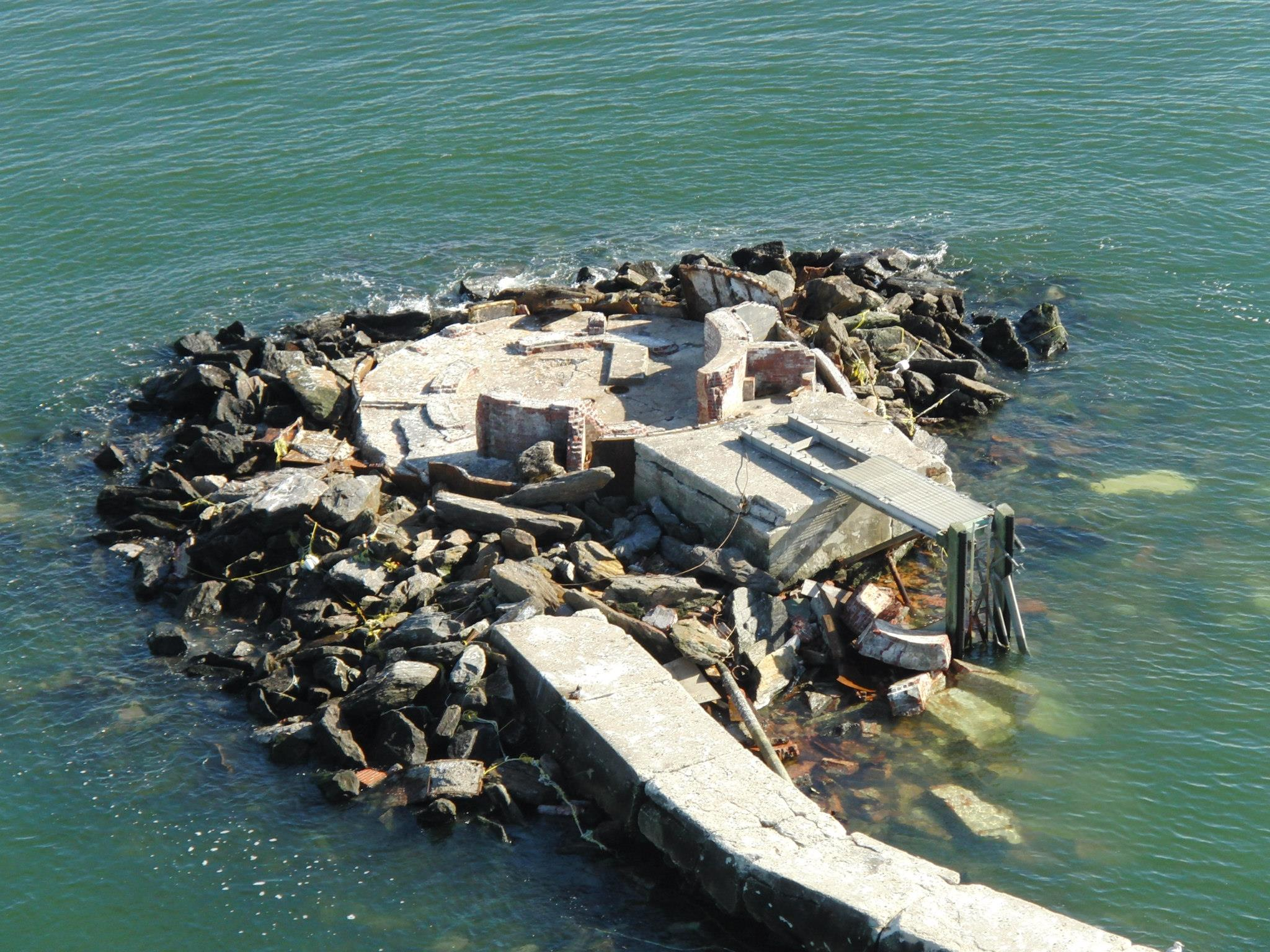
The ruins of the Old Orchard Shoal Light after being destroyed by Hurricane Sandy on October 29, 2012.

Old Orchard Shoal Light was completed and lit on April 25, 1893. The Fresnel lens was removed in 1950.

Before moving on to Governors Island and then finally Coney Island Light, Frank Schubert, said to be the last civilian lighthouse keeper in the United States, was stationed at Old Orchard Shoal Light.

Old Orchard Shoal Light is listed on the National Park Service's Maritime Heritage Program as Lighthouse to visit and as one of New York's Historic Light Stations.

On May 29, 2007, the Secretary of the Interior identified Old Orchard Shoal Light Station as surplus under the National Historic Lighthouse Preservation Act of 2000. The property was described as

Gedney Channel/Lower New York Bay, 3.5 miles south of New Dorp Beach. Remote 35 ft. conical, 3-story "spark plug" style light (1893) with keeper's quarters (approx. 1000 SF). Interior lined in brick up to 3rd floor. On 0.72 acre submerged land. Constructed of cast iron on concrete/cast iron caisson. Markings: white upper/black. Protective riprap and breakwater sheltering light's boat basin. Accessible by boat only.

No group was identified under the National Historic Lighthouse Preservation Act as willing and able to preserve the Old Orchard Shoal Light, and on June 5, 2008, the General Services Administration placed the light up for sale via an auction. The initial bid was $10,000 and the light finally closed on August 27, 2008 at a final bid of $235,000.

The lighthouse was destroyed by Hurricane Sandy on October 29, 2012.
