= West Bank Light =

Lighthouse in Staten Island, New York

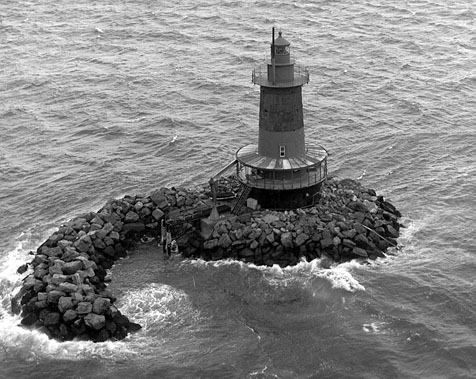
- Location: west of Ambrose Channel lower New York Bay
- Coordinates: 40°32′16.8″N 74°02′34.1″W

Tower
- Constructed: 1901
- Foundation: Concrete/cast-iron caisson
- Construction: Cast iron
- Automated: 1985
- Height: 55 feet (17 m)
- Shape: Frustum of a cone sparkplug
- Markings: Brown on black base
- Heritage: National Register of Historic Places listed place
- Fog signal: Horn: 2 blasts every 20 s

Light
- First lit: 1901
- Focal height: 69 feet (21 m)
- Lens: Fourth-order Fresnel lens (original), 12 inches (300 mm) (current)
- Range: 16 nmi (30 km; 18 mi) (white), 12 nmi (22 km; 14 mi) (red)
- Characteristic: Isophase 6s white from 181° to 004° red from 004° to 181°.
- West Bank Light
- U.S. National Register of Historic Places
- Nearest city: New Dorp Beach, Staten Island, New York City
- Area: 0.1 acres (0.040 ha)
- Architect: U.S. Lighthouse Board
- MPS: Light Stations of the United States MPS
- NRHP reference No.: 06001230
- Added to NRHP: January 9, 2007

West Bank Light, officially West Bank Front Range Light, is a lighthouse in Lower New York Bay, within New York City, and acts as the front range light for the Ambrose Channel. It is currently active and not open to the public. The tower was built in 1901 and heightened in 1908. Staten Island Light serves as the rear range light.

On May 29, 2007, the Secretary of the Interior identified West Bank Light, offshore in Ambrose Channel–Lower New York Bay, as surplus under the National Historic Lighthouse Preservation Act of 2000. The property was described as 55 feet (17 m) tall with two floors, a keeper's dwelling, and located on 0.1 acres (0.040 ha) of underwater area. The keeper's dwelling, located on the second story (about five standard stories above the ground), was 1,500 square feet (140 m^{2}). It could be seen as far as the Riegelmann Boardwalk in Coney Island, Brooklyn, as well as from South Beach, Staten Island.

No group was identified as willing and able to preserve the West Bank Light, and on June 5, 2008, the General Services Administration placed the light up for sale via auction with an initial bid was $10,000. The auction ended on August 27, 2008 at a final bid of $245,000. The sale did not close, and the light was auctioned a second time in September 2010, selling for $195,000 to Sheridan Reilly.
