= New York Bight =

Coastal embayment south of Long Island and east of New Jersey

Coordinates: 40°05′42″N 73°14′55″W

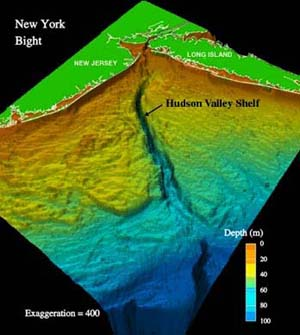
A colorized depiction of the Hudson Canyon and the New York Bight area

The New York/New Jersey Bight is the geological identification applied to a roughly triangular indentation, regarded as a bight, along the Atlantic coast of the United States that extends northeasterly from Cape May Inlet in New Jersey to Montauk Point on the eastern tip of Long Island. As the result of direct contact with the Gulf Stream along the coast of North America, the coastal climate of the bight area is temperate.

== Geography ==
The bight is formed by the roughly right-angled intersection of the generally north-south Atlantic coast of New Jersey and the approximately east–west southern coast of Long Island at the mouth of the Hudson River. The New York Bight Apex is the area including and between the Hudson River estuary and the Raritan River estuary extending 6–7 km from the coast, and it includes both the Raritan Bay and the Lower Bay.

== Weather ==
The geography of the bight has long been of major concern to meteorologists in the study of tropical storm patterns along the eastern coast of North America. These geographical characteristics of the area are among the primary reasons that, despite its northerly latitude, the New York Metropolitan Area is considered a high danger zone for storm-generated ocean-water surges. Specifically, in the presence of a hurricane off the coast of New Jersey, the easterly cyclonic winds along the northern edge of the storm could drive a strong surge to the west, laterally along the southern coast of Long Island and straight into Lower New York Bay. The angular bend of the New Jersey coast would leave little outlet for the surge, leading to widespread flooding throughout New York City, especially along the southern coast of Staten Island and Manhattan.

Examples of the effects of this phenomenon are the 1893 New York hurricane, in which storm surges of up to 30 feet (9.1 m) were reported, and Hurricane Sandy in 2012.

== Geology ==
The sea floor of the New York Bight consists largely of continental shelf. It includes the offshore Hudson Canyon, an undersea Pleistocene submarine canyon that was formed by the Hudson River during the ice ages, when the sea levels were lower.

The bight includes major shipping channels that access New York Harbor.

== Wind power ==
The Bureau of Ocean Energy Management (BOEM) is a federal agency responsible for determining offshore areas where wind farms may be built on the Outer Continental Shelf.

In March 2021, reports appeared that the Biden administration is considering giving priority designation for offshore wind projects to the New York Bight.

BOEM sells leases to qualified bidders. The waters in New Jersey and New York have been leased to private concerns for the development of US offshore wind farms. The first lease auctions were held in February 2022 for 5.6 gigawatts of power capacity and annual energy production of 19.6 TWh, for a total of $4.37 billion, with one area going for over one billion dollars. There are six leases in the New York Bight; in 2025, President Trump put all wind power developments in the New York Bight on halt indefinitely.

== See also ==
- Clean Ocean Action
- New York Harbor Storm-Surge Barrier
