= New Dorp Light =

Lighthouse in Staten Island, New York

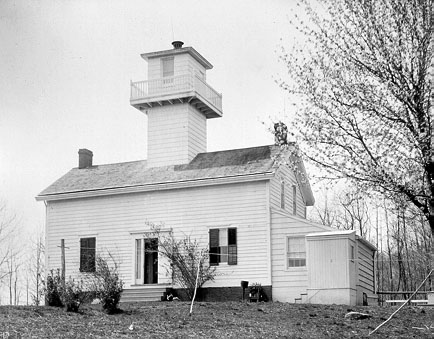
- Location: Staten Island / Lower New York Bay
- Coordinates: 40°34′51″N 74°7′12″W

Tower
- Constructed: 1856
- Foundation: Brick
- Construction: Wood
- Height: 80 feet (24 m)
- Shape: Square on center of dwelling
- Markings: White
- Heritage: New York City Landmark, National Register of Historic Places listed place

Light
- First lit: 1856
- Deactivated: 1964
- Focal height: 190 feet (58 m)
- Lens: Second Order Fresnel lens
- Characteristic: Fixed White - visible on Range line only
- New Dorp Light
- U.S. National Register of Historic Places
- New York City Landmark
- Location: Altamont St., Staten Island, New York
- Area: less than one acre
- NRHP reference No.: 73001260
- NYCL No.: 0361E

Significant dates
- Added to NRHP: August 28, 1973
- Designated NYCL: November 15, 1967

The New Dorp Lighthouse is a decommissioned lighthouse located in the New Dorp section of Staten Island, New York City. Funds for the lighthouse were approved by United States Congress on August 31, 1852 and the structure was completed in 1856. The lighthouse, built to serve as a rear range light to mark Swash Channel (a shipping channel in Lower New York Bay), was built by Richard Carlow, who also built the similar Chapel Hill and Point Comfort Range Lights in New Jersey around the same time. Ships sailing through Swash Channel were instructed to bring the New Dorp range light “in one” and steer towards the lights until the Chapel Hill Light came into view, which would then mark the channel past West Bank.

The original beacon was a second-order range lens showing a fixed red light that shined 192 feet (59 m) above sea level. In 1891 the light was changed to fixed white. In 1907 the light source was changed from oil to incandescent oil vapor, which magnified the intensity of the light. In 1939 a sixth-order range lens was installed, showing a fixed white light. John B. Fountain was the first light keeper, who resided in the light keepers house upon which the lighthouse tower was built.

The New Dorp Lighthouse was decommissioned and boarded up in 1964. The lighthouse and land were neglected and vandalized for ten years until being sold at auction to a Staten Island resident named John Vokral for $32,000 in 1974. Vokral did extensive restoration work on the lighthouse, which now serves as a private residence.

New Dorp Light was listed on the National Register of Historic Places in 1973. It was designated a New York City Landmark in 1967. It is not open to the public.

== See also ==
- List of New York City Designated Landmarks in Staten Island
- National Register of Historic Places listings in Richmond County, New York
