= Raritan Bay =

Bay in the United States

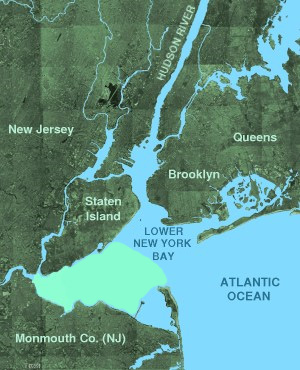
- Raritan Bay is shown as highlighted area south of Lower New York Bay and north of Monmouth County.

- Location within Monmouth County, New Jersey
- Coordinates: 40°29′00″N 74°10′59″W
- Part of: New York Bight
- Primary inflows: Raritan River; Shrewsbury River; Navesink River
- Ocean/sea sources: Atlantic Ocean
- Basin countries: United States
- Max. length: 9 miles (14 km)
- Max. width: 12 miles (19 km)
- Surface area: 69,188 acres (27,999 ha)
- Average depth: 11–30 feet (3.4–9.1 m)
- Max. depth: 45 feet (14 m)
- Residence time: 60 tidal cycles
- Salinity: 12-32 ppt
- Settlements: Perth Amboy; South Amboy; Sayreville; Keyport; Union Beach; Keansburg; Middletown Township (Sandy Hook); Old Bridge Township (Laurence Harbor); New York City

Raritan Bay is a bay located at the southern portion of Lower New York Bay between the U.S. states of New York and New Jersey and is part of the New York Bight. The bay is bounded on the northwest by New York's Staten Island, on the west by Perth Amboy, New Jersey, on the south by the Raritan Bayshore communities in the New Jersey counties of Middlesex and Monmouth, and on the east by Sandy Hook Bay. The bay is named after the Raritans, a branch of the Lenape tribe who lived in the vicinity of the bay and its river for thousands of years, prior to the arrival of Dutch and English colonists in the 17th century.

== History ==
Archeological evidence suggests that humans were already in the region at the close of the Pleistocene. The early "Big Game Hunters" vanished, but the coastal regions were resettled by peoples accustomed to village-style living ("tidewater communities") that subsisted on hunting and gathering marine shellfish, and eventually, on agriculture. In pre-Columbian times "woodlands cultures" probably centered in the Ohio Valley became the dominant cultural influence in the region. Large shell middens were found around Raritan Bay and on Staten Island, a testament of the utilization of the bay for food by Algonquin Indian tribes (Lenapes) who occupied the area when early Colonialists arrived. Early settlers used these shell piles for road construction and field fertilizer. Tottenville was once well known for its roads paved with oyster shells.

== Geology ==
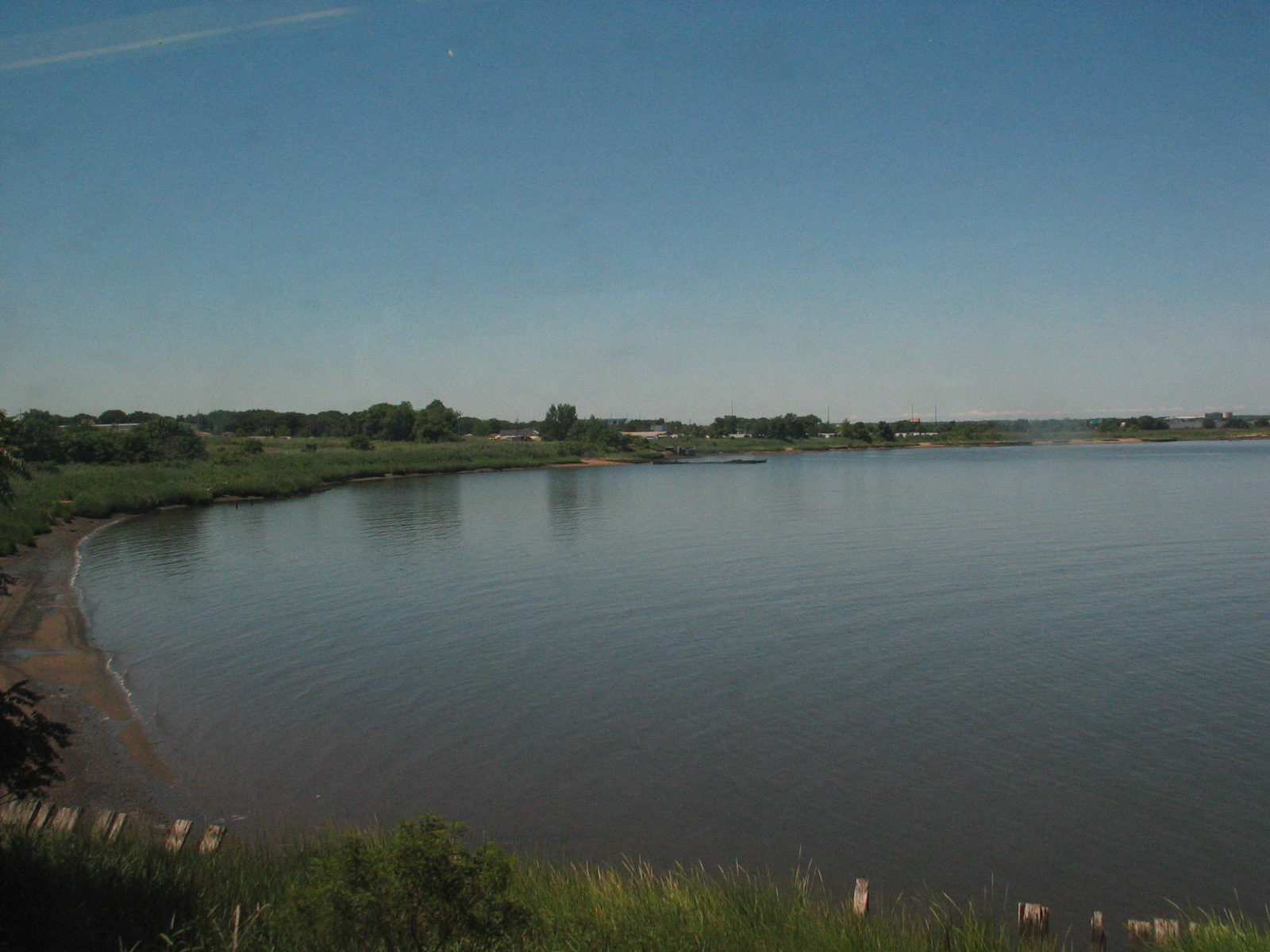
The south side of Raritan Bay

The Raritan River was perhaps the major drainage channel along the ice front throughout the Wisconsin glaciation (Stages 1, 2, 3 and 4). Prior to that time the region drained southward across the saddle between the Atlantic Highlands and the Newark Basin into the Delaware River Valley. This saddle area is a very broad flood plain that preserves river terrace gravels (Pensauken Formation) from the Sangemon Interglacial State (Stage 5), as well as older Pleistocene fluvial deposits (Bridgetown Formation). During the lowstand in sea level caused by the Wisconsin glacier, the Raritan River carved back into its headlands and captured the major drainages from the Newark Basin.

As the Wisconsin glaciers melted, the Flandrian Transgression eventually flooded the deeper valleys of the Hudson, Raritan, and Arthur Kill. During warming at the end of the Pleistocene and Early Holocene, the area encompassing Raritan Bay changed from tundra to a landscape dominated by spruce and pine forests. These forests gradually gave way to the modern deciduous forest in the region by mid-Holocene time. Lagoons and bays in the area around Sandy Hook hosted oysters, hard and soft shell clams, lobsters, blue crabs, and a variety of other invertebrates common in bays in the region today. South of western Long Island, tidal flats and wetlands occupied the margins of a tidal estuary (now submerged by marine waters). Inner Raritan Bay began to fill about 2,500 years ago with large oyster beds forming along the estuarine tributaries. Sea level continued to rise about one foot per century. This rise in sea level has resulted in the landward migration of the shoreline (aided by storm-induced coastal erosion) as much as two miles in some portions of the coast since colonial times.

== Economy and ecology ==
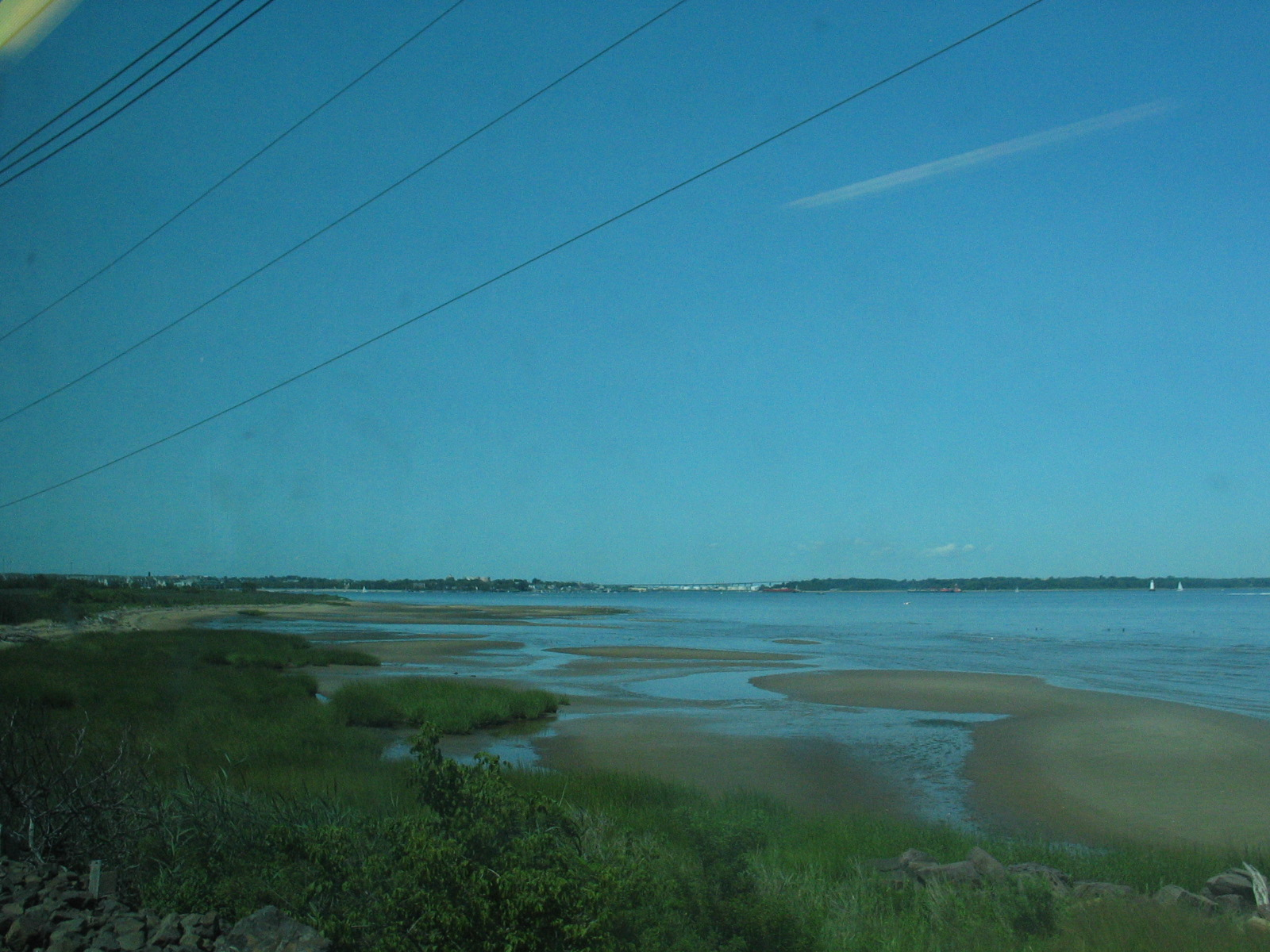
The south coast of Raritan Bay

The bay supported a lucrative fishing and shellfish industry during the nineteenth and early twentieth centuries, especially oysters, which helped to support a stable population around the bay and aided, in part, to feed the flood of immigration. Stable communities continued to grow and change with new industries supporting a larger population base. Advances in methods of fishing and shellfish collecting resulted in overextraction of these resources from the bay. The peak of the fishing industry occurred in the late 1880s to 1910s.

Fishing and farming slowly gave way to industries including ship building, ceramics, chemicals and paint manufacturing, electrolytic copper refining, and petroleum refining. In the Keasbey, New Jersey area, large pits were dug to extract the clays for ceramics and bricks, and huge chemical dumps, fly ash piles, and landfills were created to accommodate the waste from the growing industrial empire. The building of shore management structures (dikes, groins, seawalls), the spraying of DDT (and other pesticides) to control the mosquito problem, the carving of ditches to drain wetlands, the filling of shore lowlands, the channelization of creeks, highway and sewer construction, neighborhood development, and a myriad point and non-point sources of household, automobile, industrial chemicals, and ocean dumping all contributed to growing toxicity of the bay.

For most of the 20th century, the shores of Arthur Kill have been home to the largest petroleum importing, refining, and storage facilities on Earth; as a consequence the estuary has been host to major and minor oil spills. In addition, Arthur Kill drains the area encompassing the second largest landfill on Earth (Fresh Kills Landfill). This landfill, and others along the Raritan River, provide an ample supply of leachate to the waterways. Chemical wastes cause stress and disruption of the life cycles of plankton, shellfish and other invertebrates, and the fish, birds, and other wildlife that they support.

The result was an ecological disaster. The bay approached sterile conditions at the peak of pollution and algal bloom-induced anoxia. Environmental actions from the 1970s to present have helped slowly bring back sea life, but current conditions pale to the wealth of marine resources of the past; certain species of fish and birds continue to decline, and the introduction of tenacious exotic species from around the world contribute to their decline. As a sign of optimism though, oysters are beginning to naturally reappear in the Hudson River after having vanished completely about the time of World War II.

Regional industrial overdevelopment and other pollution factors have raised PCB levels in the fish catch and prompted government recommendations against its routine consumption.

The bay is crossed by a dredged channel allowing commercial ships to enter the Arthur Kill.

== Aquatic species ==
Raritan Bay's fish include striped bass, fluke, winter flounder, bluefish, porgy, black sea bass, smoothhound shark, northern puffer, northern king fish, oyster toadfish, tautog and weakfish. The crustacean species represented include the blue crab, fiddler crab, green crab, horseshoe crab and spider crab. Clams and mussels also live in Raritan Bay. The bay is a popular destination for recreational fishing due to its proximity to the densely populated areas of Central Jersey and New York City.

== See also ==
- Geography of New York-New Jersey Harbor Estuary
- Marine life of New York-New Jersey Harbor Estuary
- Long Island Sound
- Jamaica Bay
- Lower New York Bay
- Upper New York Bay
- New York Harbor
