= Ambrose Channel =

Shipping channel in the Port of New York and New Jersey

Coordinates: 40.5184398°N 73.9904166°W

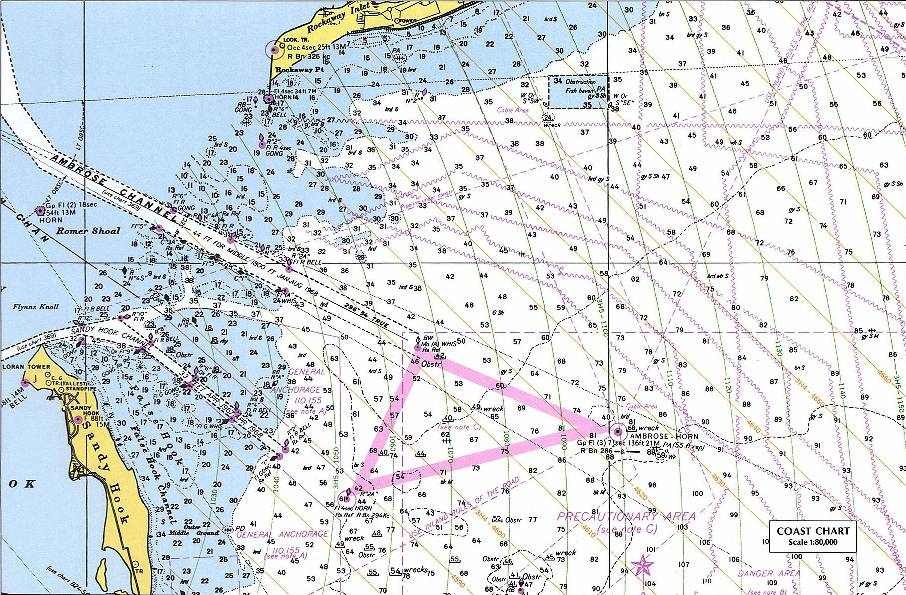
Nautical chart showing southern end of Ambrose Channel

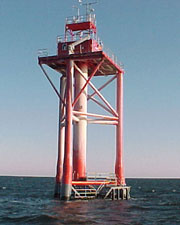
Ambrose Light 1999–2008

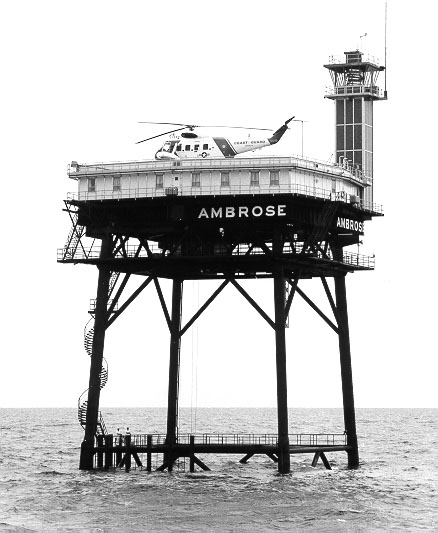
Original Ambrose Light Station, a Texas Tower built in 1967

Ambrose Channel is the only shipping channel in and out of the Port of New York and New Jersey. The channel is considered to be part of Lower New York Bay and is located several miles off the coasts of Sandy Hook, New Jersey, and Breezy Point, New York. Ambrose Channel terminates at Ambrose Anchorage, just south of the Verrazzano–Narrows Bridge, the gateway to New York Harbor, where it becomes known as the Anchorage Channel. It is named for John Wolfe Ambrose, an engineer from New York.

The entrance to the channel was marked by Ambrose Light which doubled as a staging area for pilot boats, most notably the Sandy Hook Pilots. Prior to the construction of the light tower in 1967 the channel was marked by the Ambrose Lightship, one of a class of lightships operated and maintained by the United States Coast Guard for the express purpose of marking main shipping channels for major ports. After being struck by small boats on a number of occasions, the light tower was redesigned and relocated in 1999, and finally decommissioned and removed in 2008.

Once inside the Narrows, Ambrose becomes the Anchorage Channel which splits into channels to marine terminals. Connecting channels are the Bay Ridge, the Red Hook, the Buttermilk, the Claremont, the Port Jersey, the Kill Van Kull, the Newark Bay, the Port Newark, the Elizabeth, and the Arthur Kill. Anchorages are known as Stapleton, Bay Ridge and Gravesend.

== See also ==
- Ambrose Channel pilot cable
- Hudson Canyon
- New York Bight
