= ExxonMobil–New Jersey environmental contamination settlement =

2015 legal settlement

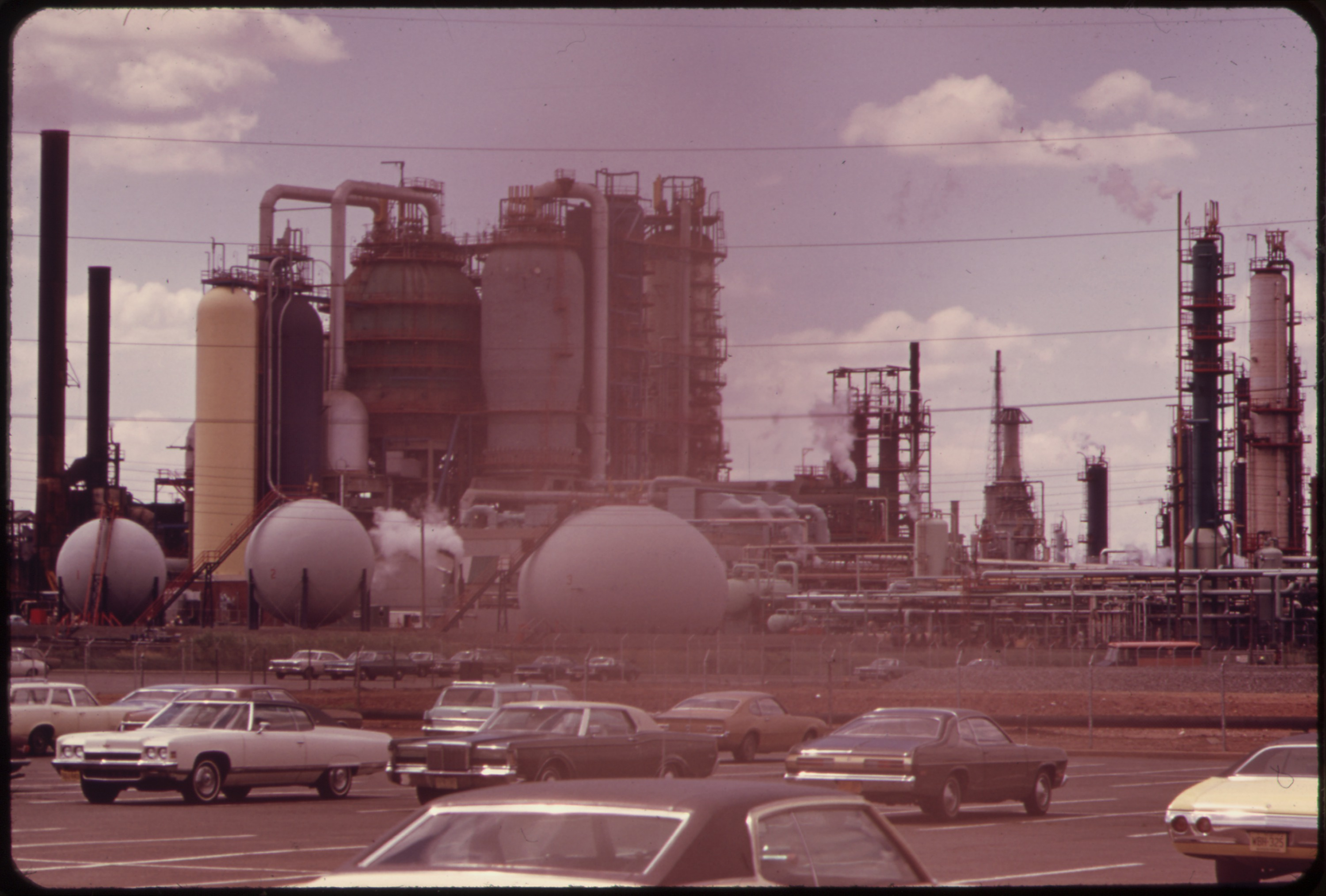
Portion of the Bayway Refinery as seen from the New Jersey Turnpike in 1973

The Exxon Mobil–New Jersey Environmental Pollution Settlement was a 2015 legal settlement between ExxonMobil and the New Jersey Department of Environmental Protection, over contaminated sites at oil refinery plants and other facilities at Bayway Refinery in Linden and Bayonne Refinery in Bayonne, New Jersey dating back to the Standard Oil's use of the properties starting in the 1870s. The settlement was controversially settled by Governor Chris Christie's Administration for far less than the state originally sought when it began the lawsuit in 2004, and has been the subject of intense criticism from activists and environmentalists.

== Background ==
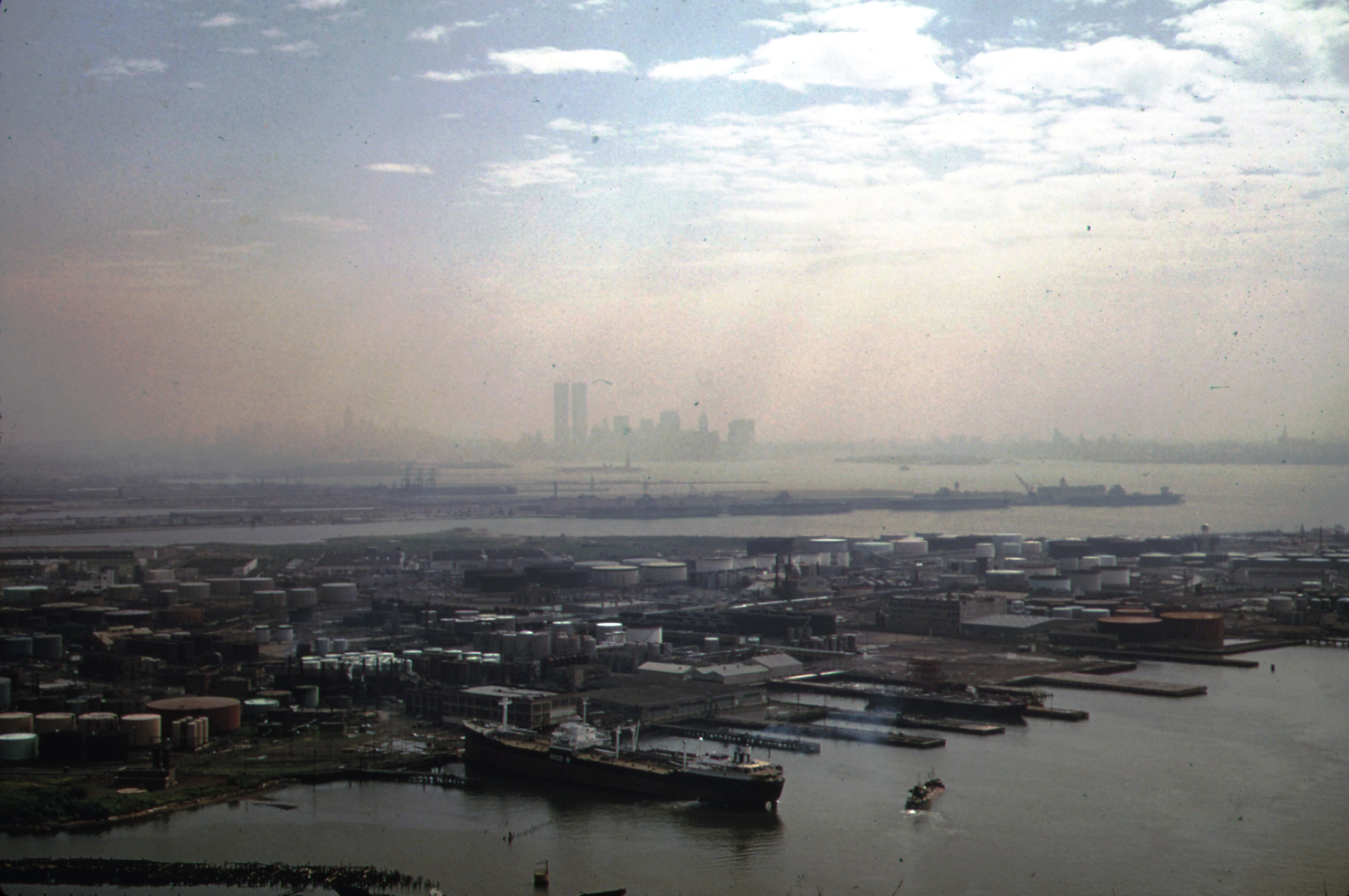
Constable Hook on Kill van Kull and Upper New York Bay in Bayonne

In 1872, John D. Rockefeller's Standard Oil bought 176 acres of land on Constable Hook in Bayonne and by 1885 there was a pipeline connecting it to the field of Texas. Standard Oil opened Bayway Refinery in Linden, New Jersey in 1909. The refinery is part of the iconic imagery of New Jersey, visible to all passing cars on the New Jersey Turnpike.

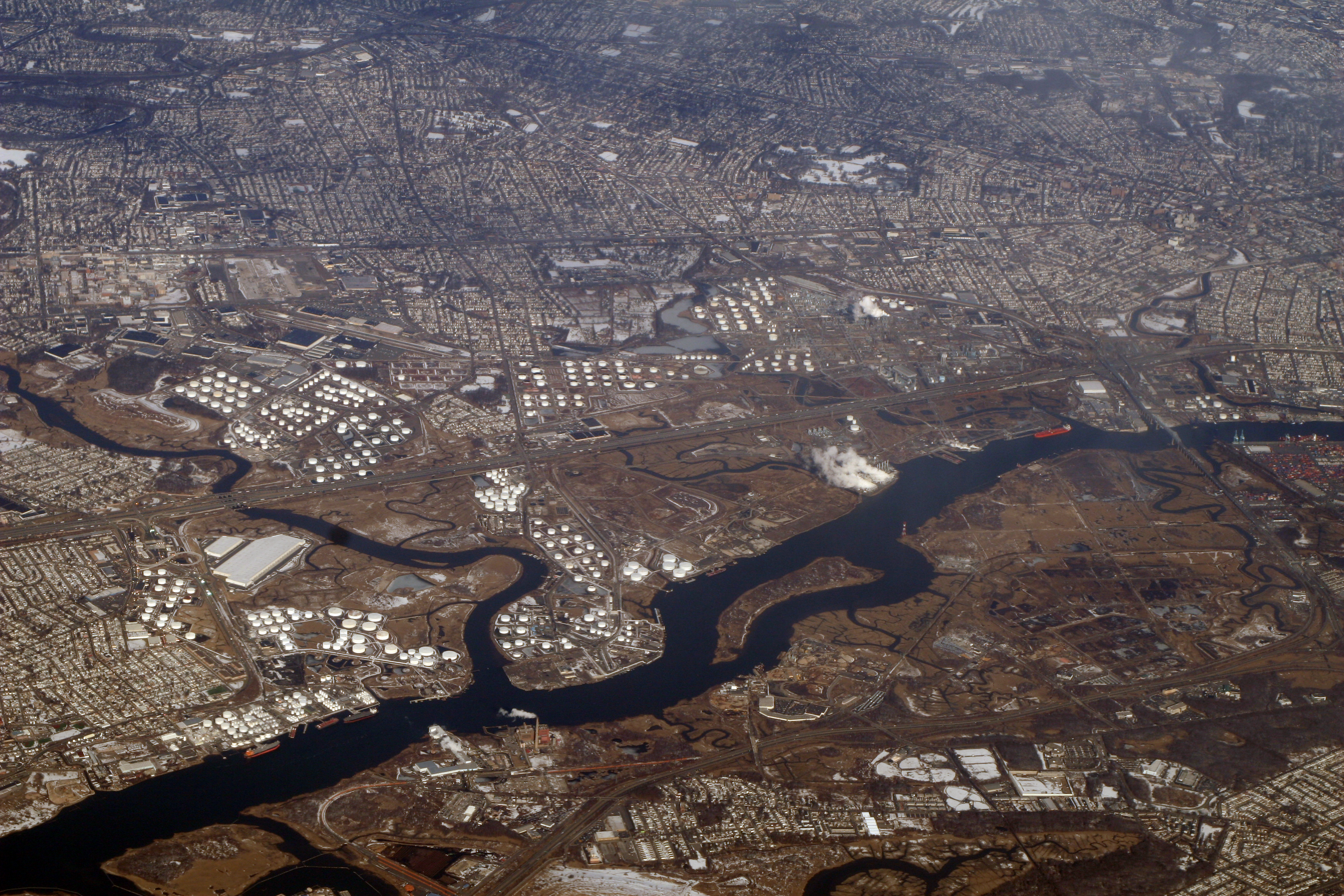
Bayway Refinery (center right) is part of the industrial complex on the salt marshes along the Rahway River Morses Creek and Arthur Kill.

Standard Oil was famously split in 1911, with Standard Oil of New Jersey taking over operations in the state. The company eventually became Exxon, which merged with Mobil in 1999.

Before its merger with Mobil, Exxon in 1991 agreed to clean up contaminated sites at Bayway and Bayonne without specified spending caps.

Officials suggest that in the past century over seven million gallons of oil have been spilled or leaked, with over 600 contaminants found in the soils between the two refineries. As of 2015, contamination covered over 1,800 acres in the Bayway area.

Although federal law authorized states to sue corporations for environmental damages in the 1970s, a judge in 2009 ruled that ExxonMobil could nonetheless be liable for damages caused before the law passed, dating back to the 1870s. As of 2015, Exxon had paid for roughly $260 million in cleanups.

== Lawsuit ==
In 2004, the New Jersey Department of Environmental Protection sued ExxonMobil for $8.9 billion, over lost wetland resources, which were not originally covered under the cleanup agreement. At the time, it was the largest amount ever sought in a contamination civil suit.

In 2008, a judge ruled that ExxonMobil was responsible for "creating a public nuisance" with severe environmental contamination at sites around the refineries, thus initiating new litigations over how much Exxon was liable to pay to the state of New Jersey. ExxonMobil contended that it merely acted as government permits allowed, and has never admitted wrongdoing.

The case proceeded through the gubernatorial terms of Democrats Jim McGreevey, Richard Codey, Jon Corzine, and Republican Chris Christie.

Although a New Jersey Superior Court justice was believed to be close to a ruling, the Christie Administration repeatedly asked the judge to wait, since they were reaching a settlement with ExxonMobil's attorneys. On Friday, February 19, 2015, lawyers for the Christie administration informed the judge that a deal had been reached. Details of the $225 million settlement - roughly 3 percent of what the state originally sought - were not immediately released. Christopher Porrino served as Chief Counsel to the Christie administration from January 2014 through July 2015 and handled negotiations in the case.

State Superior Court judge Michael Hogan approved the settlement on August 25, 2015, calling it "fair, reasonable, in the public interest, and consistent with the goals of the Spill Compensation and Control Act." Hogan suggested the settlement is not "one which the court itself might have fashioned, or considers ideal," but that it lives up to the standards for a contamination settlement.

The Murphy administration defended the settlement.

== Criticism ==
Since Christie's term was set to end in January 2018, some observers suggested the settlement was rushed by the administration to plug immediate budget shortfalls. In an op-ed in NJ.com, state Senator Raymond Lesniak called for the state's acting attorney general John Jay Hoffman to resign for his role in the settlement.

Environmental Advocates immediately slammed the settlement as wholly inadequate. David Pringle, campaign director for the state chapter of Clean Water Action, called it "the biggest corporate subsidy in state history". "Governor Christie has abandoned his responsibility to protect the public trust," said Pringle, advocating that the deal be overturned.

Jeff Tittel, director of the state's chapter of the Sierra Club, which was also highly critical of the deal, said it will further weaken environmental protection efforts that Christie had already undermined throughout his tenure as governor.

Environment New Jersey and the Delaware Riverkeeper also advocated the settlement be overturned. NY/NY Baykeeper executive director Debbie Mans suggested that Exxon could not be trusted to finish the cleanup properly, suggesting that anyone who believes they would is "dreaming".

Bradley M. Campbell is an attorney and former commissioner of the New Jersey Department of Environmental Protection, and administrator of the United States Environmental Protection Agency's mid-Atlantic region from 1999 to 2001, who initiated the case. He questioned and criticized the settlement in a letter to The New York Times, questioning its timing and Governor's Office involvement. He accused Christie of deliberately cutting a deal favorable to Exxon at the state's expense, pointing out, "While he was chairman of the Republican Governors Association in 2014, the group received $500,000 from Exxon and more from company employees," and that this happened during the trial. ExxonMobil did give $500,000 to the Republican Governors Association in 2014, when Christie was chairman, though they have insisted that was related only to the Republican governors bench as a whole.

== Supreme Court ruling ==
In June 2018, the New Jersey Supreme Court ruled that challengers to the settlement had no standing, thus preventing any further recourse.

== See also ==
- Bayonne refinery strikes of 1915–16
