= Tidal strait =

Narrow seaway connecting two bodies of water

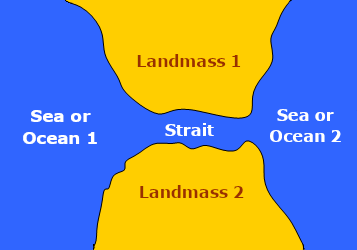
A tidal strait passing between two landmasses

A tidal strait is a strait through which a tidal current flows. Tidal currents are usually unidirectional but sometimes are bidirectional. Tidal straits, though they are narrow seaways, are technically not rivers. They are frequently of tectonic origin. In them, currents develop because of elevation differences between the water basins at both ends. Tidal straits can connect seas and oceans, as well as estuarine zones.

Tides sometimes allow sediments to collect in tidal straits.

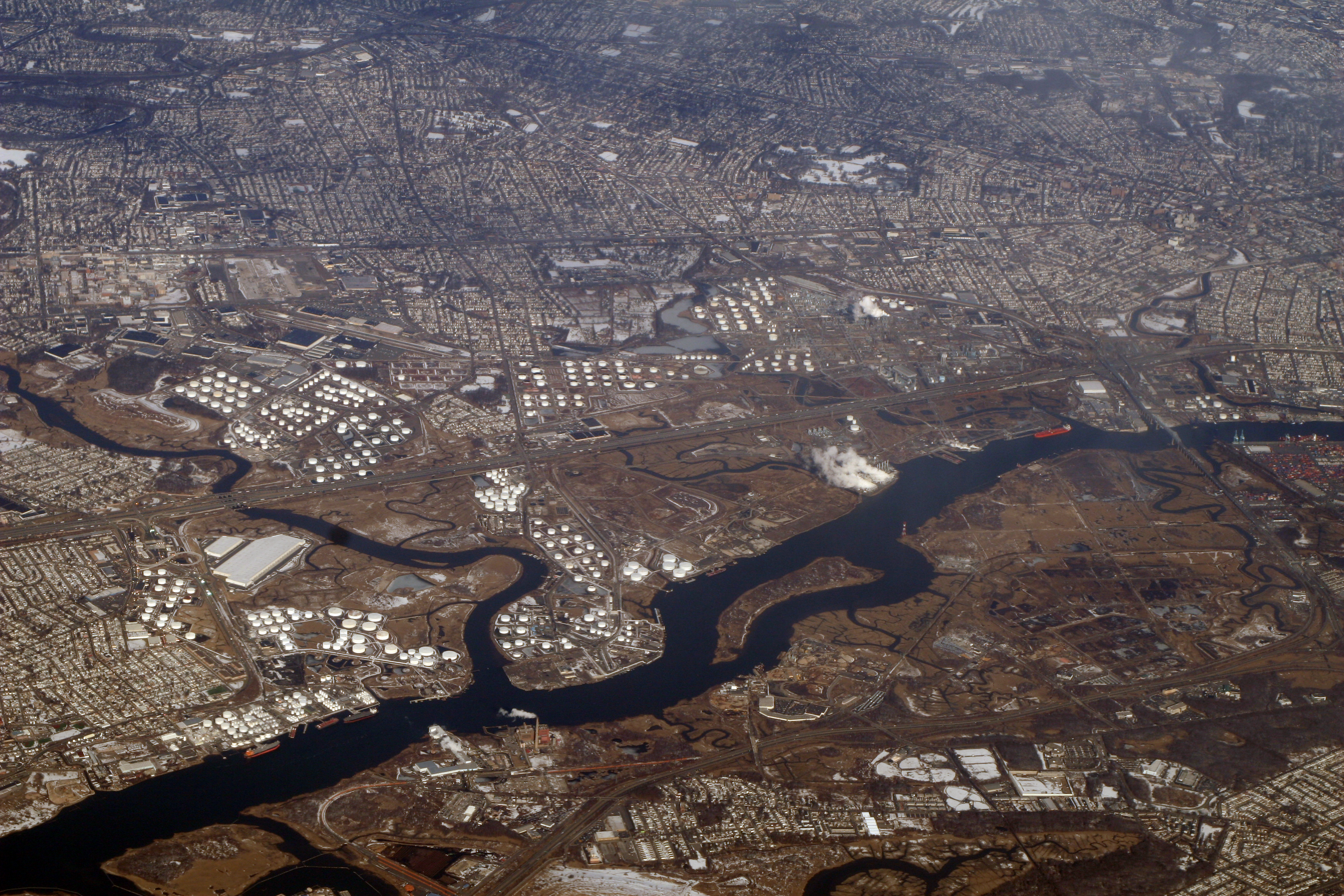
Arthur Kill tidal strait, Prall's Island visible

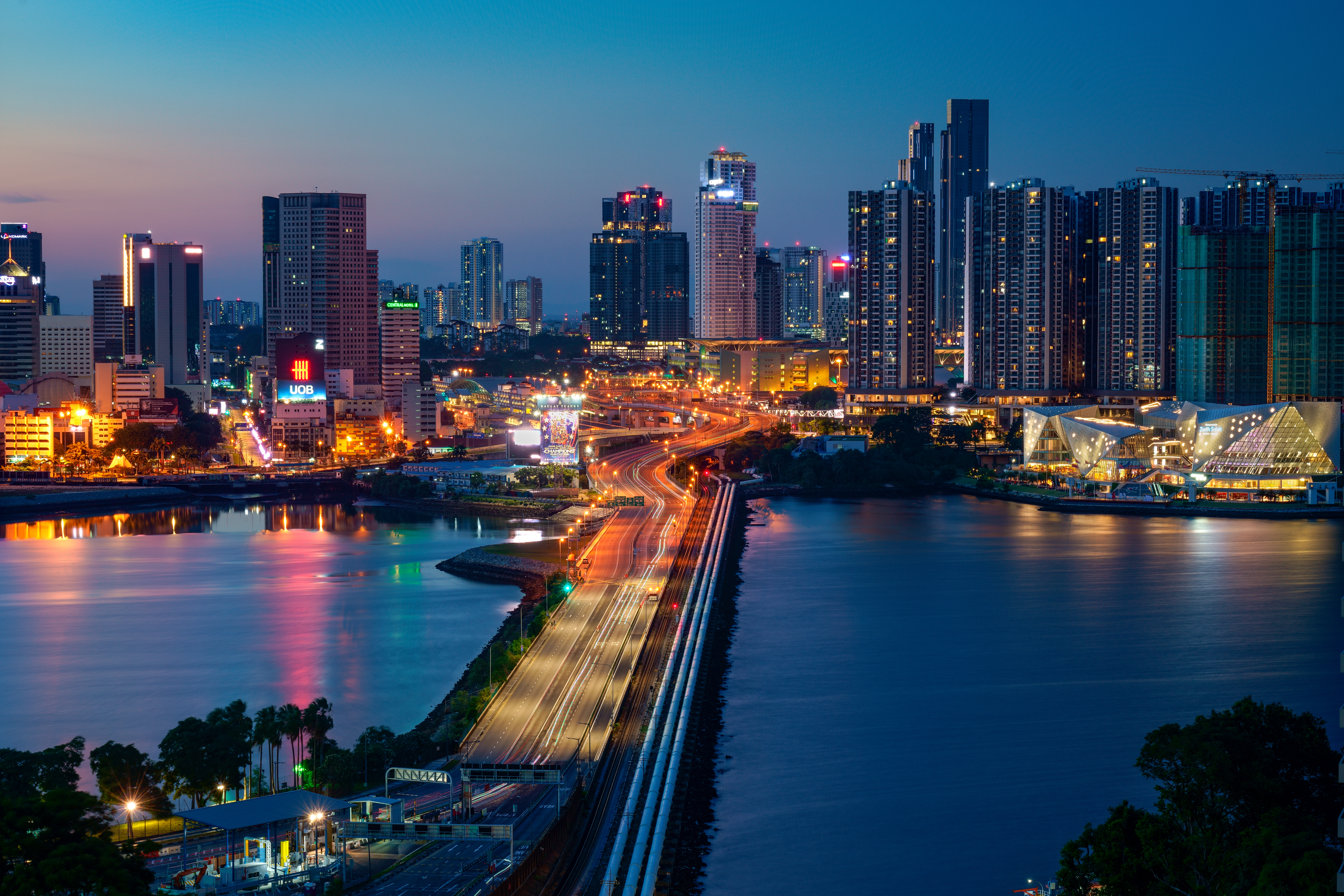
The Johor–Singapore Causeway disrupts tidal flow on the Strait of Johor.

== See also ==
- Sediment trap (geology)
- Tidal circularization
