= Piles Creek =

Stream in Union County, New Jersey

Coordinates: 40.6217°N 74.2072°W

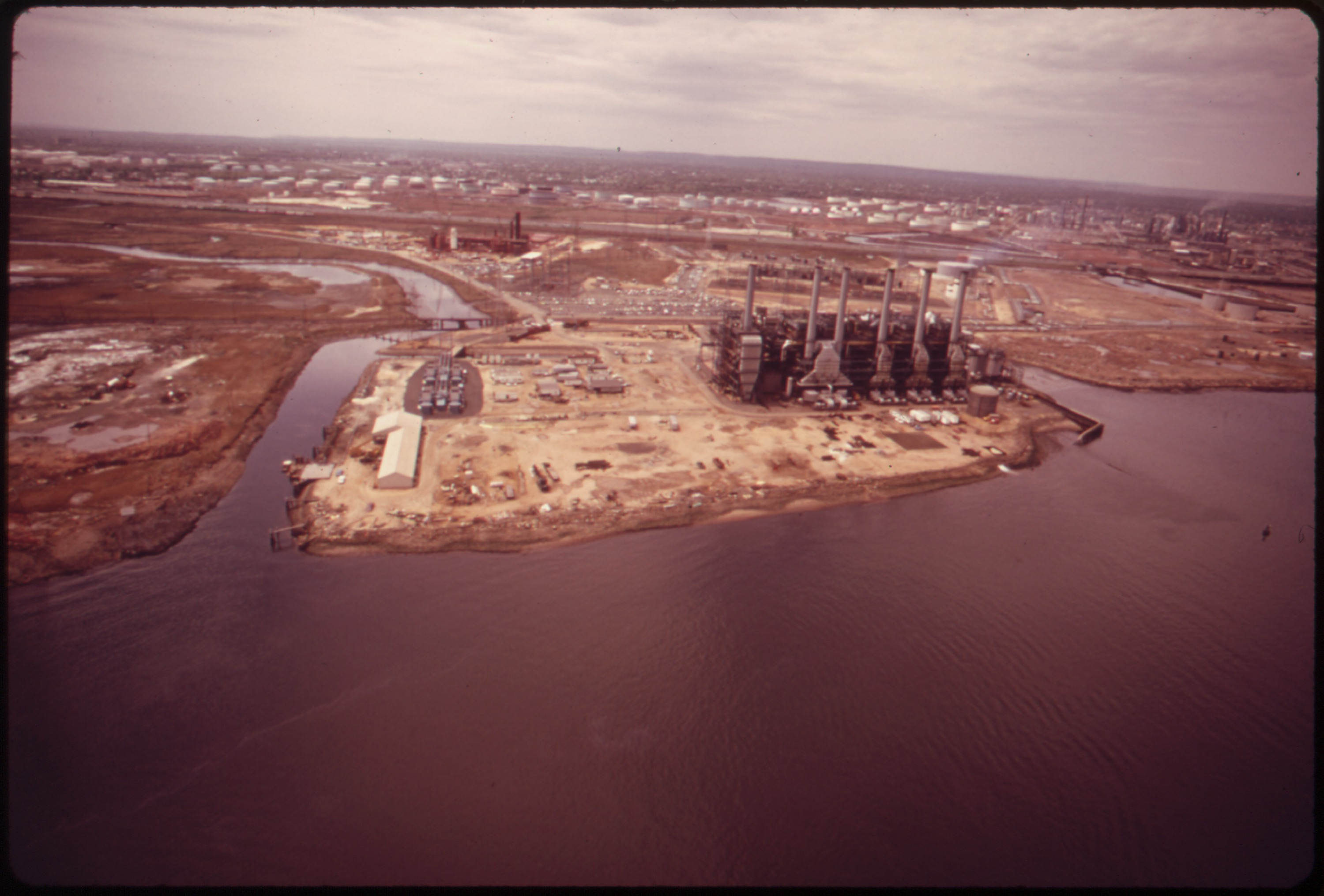
At left of the Linden Generating Station at mouth at Arthur Kill

Piles Creek is a stream in Union County, New Jersey. It empties in the Arthur Kill tidal strait in Linden on the Chemical Coast between the mouth of Morses Creek and the mouth of the Rahway River just below the Linden Generating Station, a power plant. It is one of several tributaries of the Arthur Kill along with other rivers and streams including the Elizabeth River, Rahway River, Morses Creek, Fresh Kills, and, via Newark Bay, the Passaic River and the Hackensack River.

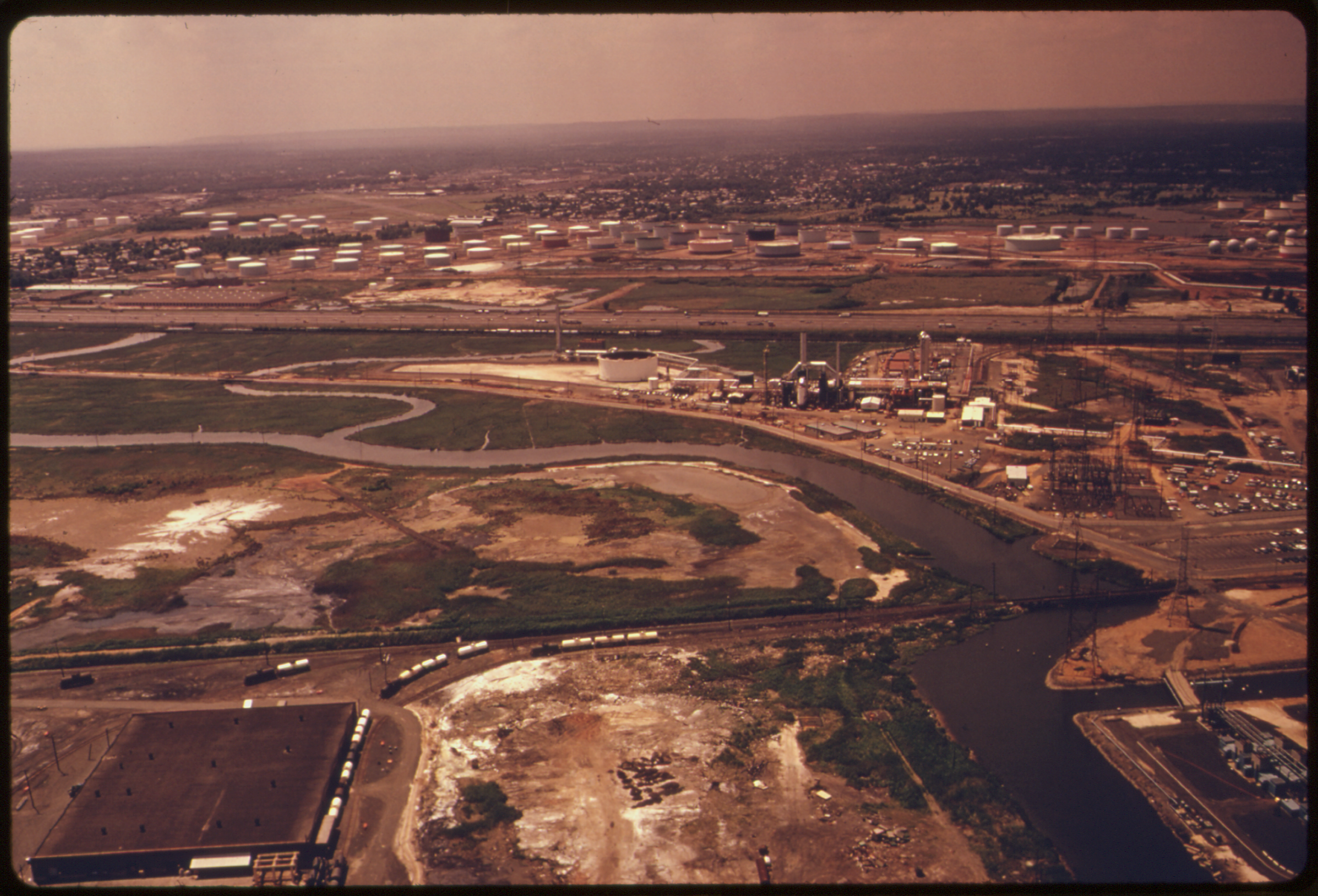
Aerial view

Rutgers University ecology scientists have documented the bizarre transformations to Piles Creek marine species caused by contamination and toxicity. The creek was extended as part of wetlands mitigation project for the expansion of the New Jersey Turnpike. GAF Materials Corporation was once located along the creek. Public Service Enterprise Group (PSE&G) opened a solar farm on a brownfield site along the shore of the creek in 2014.

== See also ==
- List of rivers of New Jersey
- Geography of New York–New Jersey Harbor Estuary
