= Pilgrim Pipeline =

The Pilgrim Pipeline was a planned 178-mile pipeline that would deliver up to 200,000 barrels of crude oil and other fuel products per day from Albany, New York to coastal Linden, New Jersey on the Arthur Kill.

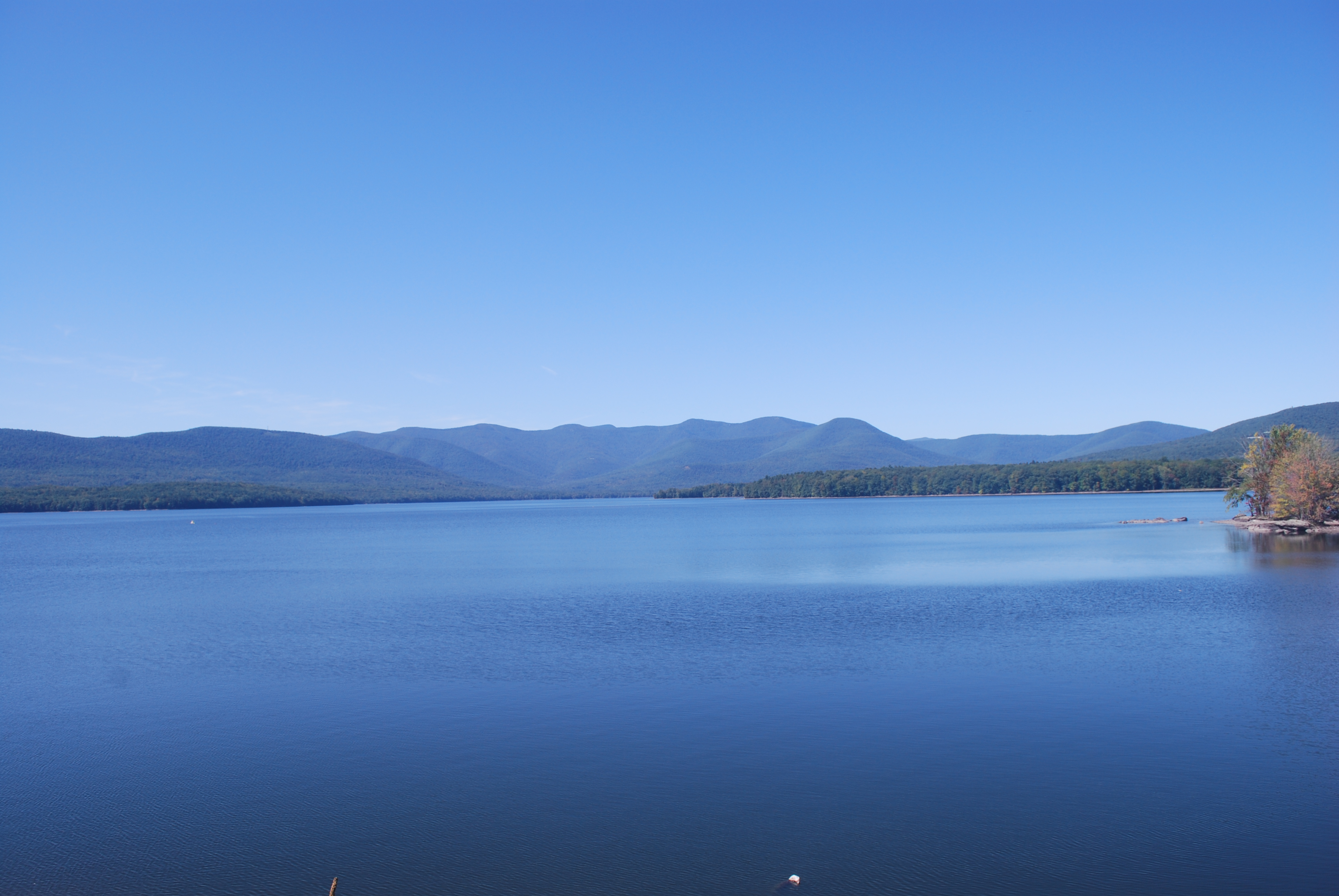
The Ashokan Reservoir which sits in Ulster County, New York

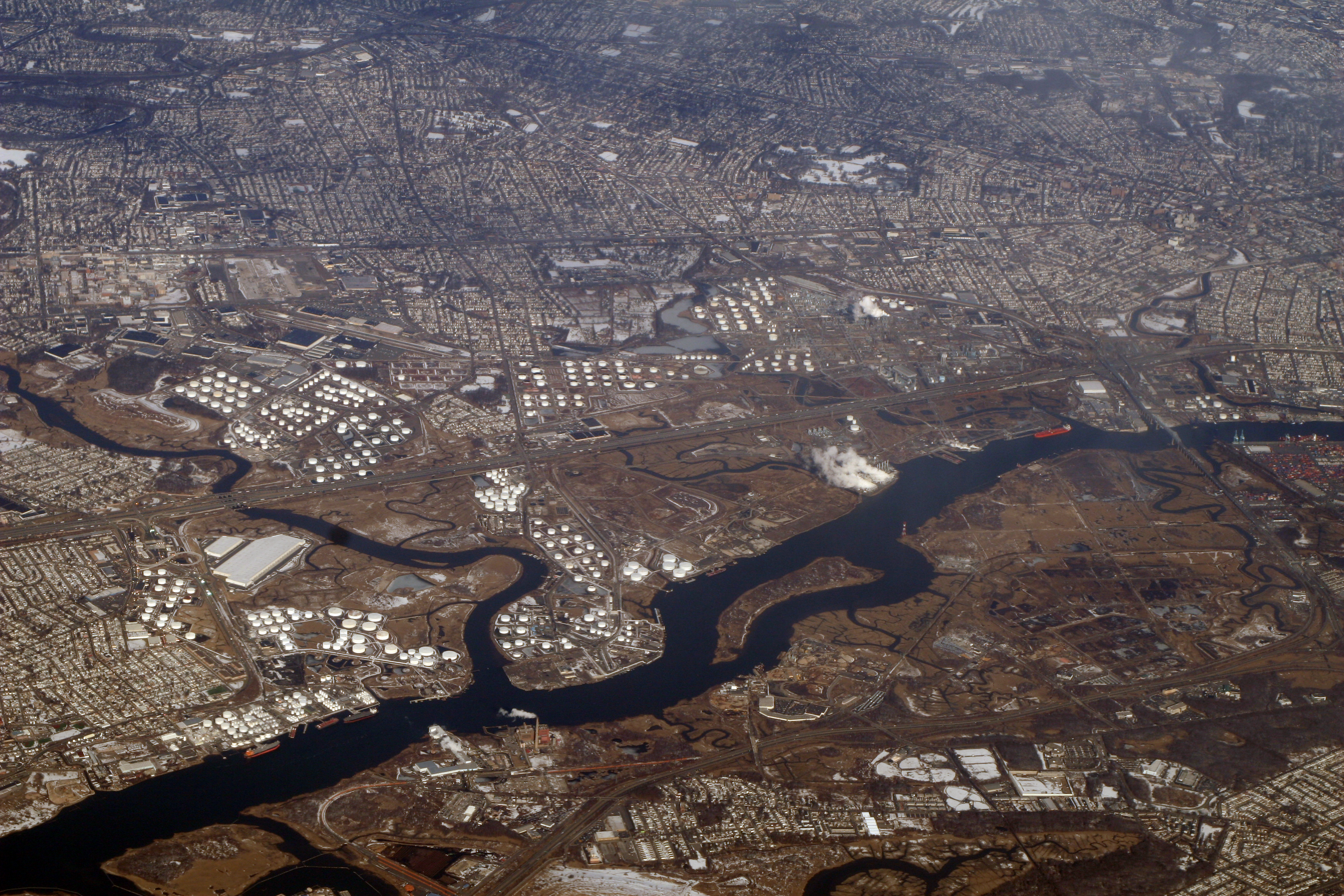
Aerial photo of the Arthur Kill in Linden, New Jersey where the pipeline would terminate

By 2021, the Pilgrim Pipelines Holdings, LLC website had been abandoned, as well as its social media presence.

== Background ==
Pilgrim Transportation of New York, Inc. first proposed the Pilgrim Pipeline and began lobbying in 2013.

Pilgrim Pipelines Holdings, LLC, a company founded in 2014 by Koch Industries alumni, planned to run two side-by-side pipelines which would carry products like gasoline, kerosene, aviation fuel and home heating oil northbound—and highly flammable Bakken formation crude oil southbound—between Albany, New York and the Bayway Refinery on the Arthur Kill tidal estuary in Linden, New Jersey.

Pilgrim Pipelines Holdings, LLC is owned by Ares Management. The entity financing the Pilgrim Pipeline was Ares EIF Investors Funds.

The North Dakota oil in question is drilled via fracking, in which large amounts of water, sand, and chemicals are pumped deep underground under very high pressure to fracture apart shale deposits to release oil and gas.

The project was initially supported by lobbyists connected with Republican NJ Governor Chris Christie. In 2018 developers hired lobbyists connected with Democratic NJ Governor Phil Murphy.

By 2021, the Pilgrim Pipelines Holdings, LLC website had been abandoned, as well as its social media presence.

== Concerns ==
Area residents had expressed numerous complaints about the proposed pipeline.

Safety and drinking water concerns. Some assert that the pipeline poses risk to the residential communities through which it will pass, including the risk of highly flammable volatiles causing explosions and possible unsafe levels of cancer-causing chemicals and drinking water contamination.

In April 2017, "Talk of the Town" TV35 host Ashley Legg interviewed the campaign director of Clean Water Action about the proposed Pilgrim Pipeline, an oil and fuel pipeline set to run next to Hillside Avenue School if approved.

According to an activist group, the Pilgrim proposal would intersect with various aquifers and drinking-water sources and risk contamination, including the following: "The Highlands region in NJ...provides drinking water to more than 4.5 million people in NJ. Pilgrim’s proposal cuts across 3 major drinking water rivers, numerous smaller streams and two EPA designated sole source aquifers (the Ramapo Aquifer and the Buried Valley Aquifer) in New Jersey. In New York it crosses 232 regulated streams"

Pollution and environmental destruction concerns.

Others fear possible destruction of wetlands, toxic air emissions and soil erosion due to construction.

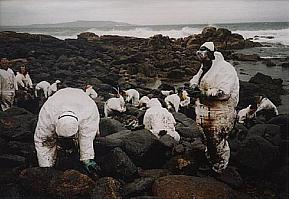
Volunteers work at cleaning the 2002 Prestige oil spill on the Galicia Coast

Risk of drop in property values. Local residents have expressed outrage over the expected drop in property values for homes near the pipeline.

Quality of life concerns. Some homeowners along the proposed Pipeline have said they felt harassed, intimidated or deceived by past efforts by the owners of the proposed line to access their property for surveys and studies.

Others have claimed that a great deal of noise and disruption is to be experienced during construction.

== Support ==
Some argue that the region would better avoid price spikes and fuel shortages if a direct pipeline allowed it access to fossil fuels, rather than exclusive reliance on rail and river barge. Others note that the Pipeline would create an explosion of local construction and maintenance jobs.

== Opposition groups ==
Fifteen North Jersey municipalities created the Municipal Pipeline Group (MPG) in response to the proposed Pilgrim Pipeline.

Other opposed groups include Citizen Action of the Hudson Valley, the NY-NJ Coalition Against the Pilgrim Pipeline (CAPP), and the New Paltz Climate Action Coalition.

== Planned route ==
The proposed route closely tracked the New York State Thruway, running parallel to, and west of, the Hudson River.

=== New York route ===
As of 2017, the corporation planned to run the fossil fuel pipeline through 28 New York municipalities in six counties:

- Albany
- Athens
- Bethlehem
- Catskill
- Coeymans
- Cornwall
- Cornwall on Hudson
- Coxsackie
- East Greenbush
- Esopus
- Gardiner
- Harriman
- Kingston
- Lloyd
- New Baltimore
- Newburgh
- New Paltz
- New Windsor
- Plattekill
- Ramapo
- Rensselaer
- Rosendale
- Saugerties
- Tuxedo
- Tuxedo Park
- Ulster
- Wawarsing
- Woodbury

=== New Jersey route ===
The company expects its pipeline to cross 29 municipalities throughout five New Jersey counties:

- Berkeley Heights
- Bloomingdale
- Chatham Borough
- Chatham Township
- Clark
- Cranford
- East Hanover
- Edison
- Fanwood
- Florham Park
- Kinnelon
- Linden
- Livingston
- Madison
- Mahwah
- Montville
- New Providence
- Oakland
- Parsippany
- Pequannock
- Pompton Lakes
- Riverdale
- Roselle
- Scotch Plains
- Wanaque
- Watchung
- Westfield
- Woodbridge
- Wyckoff

== Split Rock Sweetwater Prayer Camp ==
In protest of the Pilgrim Pipeline on their lands and in solidarity with Standing Rock and other clean water movements, members of the Ramapough Mountain Indians founded the Split Rock Sweetwater protest encampment on their lands in Mahwah, New Jersey in 2016 near the New York border.

In March 2017, starting at Waterfront Park in Carteret, New Jersey on the Chemical Coast of the Arthur Kill near the proposed terminus of the pipeline, activists marched on a 90-mile Water Walk for Life for water/pipeline awareness, in particular the Pilgrim Pipeline & SPECTRA-AIM in the region. Split Rock Sweetwater Prayer Camp welcomed the peace walkers on their journey Longtime peace activist Jun-San Yesuda, a Buddhist nun of the Nipponzan-Myōhōji order and colleagues at the Grafton Peace Pagoda helped organize the walk.

== See also ==
- The Chemical Coast
