= Infineum =

British chemicals company

Infineum International Limited
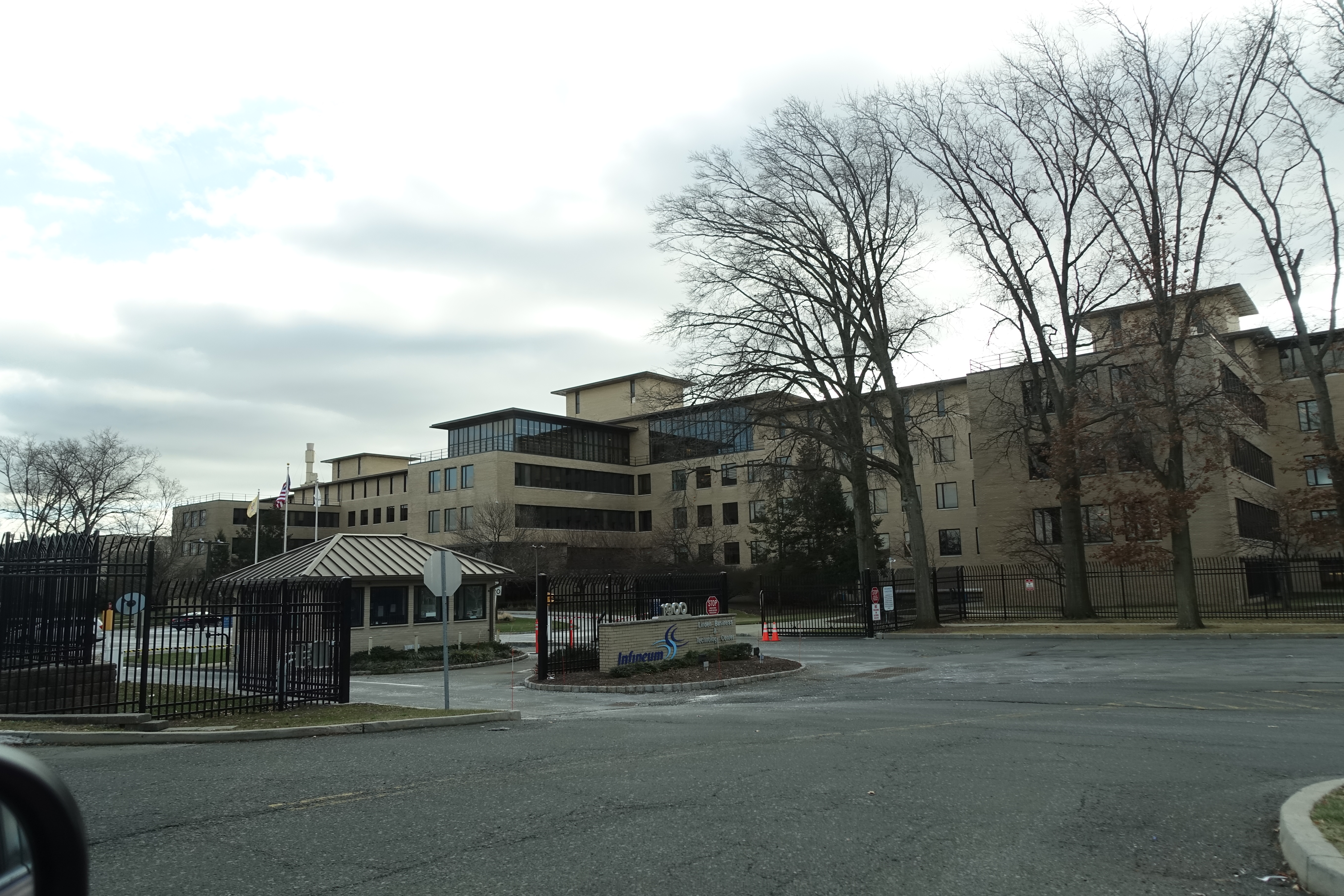
- The Infineum complex near the Bayway Refinery in Linden, New Jersey.
- Type: Limited Liability
- Industry: Chemicals
- Founded: 1999
- Headquarters: Abingdon, United Kingdom
- Area served: Worldwide
- Products: Lubricant and Fuel Additive lines
- Owner: Shell and Exxonmobil
- Number of employees: 1800 (2018)
- Website: https://www.infineum.com/en-gb/

Infineum International Limited is a joint venture between ExxonMobil and Shell plc through each companies' chemical divisions. Its headquarters are located in Abingdon, England and it has operating centers throughout the United Kingdom, United States, Germany, France, Italy, China, Singapore, Japan.

== Background ==
Infineum is a formulator, manufacturer and marketer of petroleum additives for the fuel and lubricant industries. Their products are classified into five distinct groups: driveline additives, engine oil additives, fuel additives, marine additives and industrial products. Their products include small engine, passenger car motor, heavy-duty engine, gas engine, and marine oils along with fuels, transmission fluids, viscosity modifiers, and pour point depressants.

They first created pour point depressants in the 1930s.

In 2001, Texaco purchased Infineum's blending facility in Ghent, Belgium. Under the agreement between Texaco and Infineum, Texaco would continue manufacture of Infineum's Viscosity Modifier products at the plant. In March 2007, Infineum and Chevron Fuel & Marine Marketing entered into an agreement concerning the global supply of fuel additives to the marine industry. In 2011, the company announced that it would be collaborating with Nano Terra, a Boston-based nanotechnology company, to research the development of a "new class of materials".

In 2012, Infineum began construction of a calcium salicylate plant on Jurong Island in Singapore. Calcium salicylate is used as a detergent in Infineum's engine oil formulations.

In February 2017, Infineum announced that Logility Voyager Solutions, a cloud-based business planning platform, had been selected to optimize the company's supply chain with regard to inventory and shipments.

== China ==
In 2001, the company signed a letter of intent to form a joint venture with Sinopec Shanghai Gao Qiao Petrochemical. The joint venture, called Shanghai High-Lube Additives, built a lubricant blending plant in Pudong, Shanghai. In 2013 Infineum opened Infineum (Shanghai) Additives Co, and in 2014 they opened the China Business & Technology Center. In 2016, the company opened an additive blending plant in China's Zhangjiagang, Jiangsu province. The Zhangjiagang plant is Infineum's first wholly owned blending plant in China and it can produce up to 100,000 tonnes of lubricant additive a year.

== See also ==
- Lubrizol
- Chevron Oronite
- Croda Lubricants
