= Fresh Kills =

Estuary in Staten Island, New York

Coordinates: 40.57667°N 74.18733°W

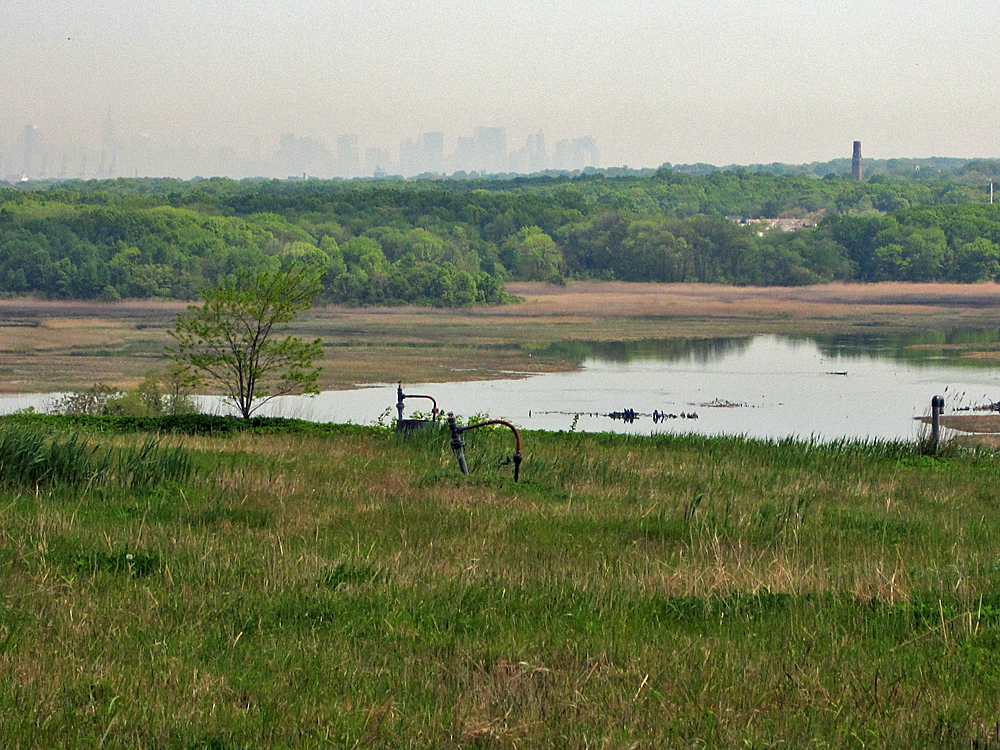
- View of Fresh Kills from Fresh Kills Park

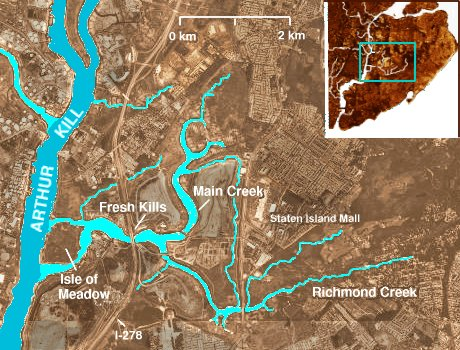
- Fresh Kills on the western edge of Staten Island

Location
- Country: United States
- State: New York
- City: New York City
- Borough: Staten Island

Fresh Kills (from the Middle Dutch word kille, meaning "riverbed" or "water channel") is a stream and freshwater estuary in the western portion of the borough of Staten Island in New York City, United States. It is the site of the Fresh Kills Landfill, formerly New York City's principal landfill.

The watershed of the Fresh Kills drains much of the wet lowlands of the western portion of the island and flows into the Arthur Kill around the Isle of Meadows. Its co-tributaries include the Rahway River, Morses Creek, Piles Creek, and—via Newark Bay—the Passaic River and the Hackensack River. The channel around the north end of the Isle of Meadows is sometimes called Little Fresh Kill and the southern channel is called Great Fresh Kill.

The stream has two major branches. The north branch is Main Creek and the Springville Creek. The south branch is Richmond Creek, which drains much of the central part of the island, with its headwaters near Historic Richmond Town, on the southern end of the terminal moraine of the island. The system of streams provides recreational kayaking and wildlife viewing in the preserved wetlands.

Since 2006, the New York City Department of Parks and Recreation has been implementing the master plan developed by landscape architecture firm Field Operations to transform Fresh Kills Landfill into Freshkills Park. Covering 2,200 acres (8.9 km^{2}), nearly three times the size of Central Park, Freshkills Park will offer a variety of public spaces and facilities for varied activities including nature trails, mountain biking, community events, outdoor dining, sports fields, kayaking and canoeing. In addition, the park's design, ecological restoration and cultural and educational programming will emphasize environmental sustainability and a renewed public concern for our human impact on earth. Renewable energy is planned both for use in capital projects and for large-scale demonstration and public benefit. Photovoltaic cells, wind turbines and geothermal heating and cooling are components of current capital projects. While the full build-out will continue in phases for the next 30 years, the first sections of parkland to be developed opened in early 2010, and the park is expected to be complete by the 2030s.

== See also ==
- Geography of New York Harbor
- List of New York rivers
