= Morses Creek (New Jersey) =

Stream in Union County, New Jersey

Coordinates: 40.637193°N 74.214449°W

Morses Creek is a stream in Union County, New Jersey. It is a tributary of the Arthur Kill along with other rivers and streams, including the Elizabeth River, Rahway River, Piles Creek and Fresh Kills, and via Newark Bay, the Passaic River and the Hackensack River. Earlier names include Thompson's or Nine Mile Creek as well as Morse's Creek or Morse Creek. It is named for the family of Peter Morse, also spelled "Morss," who settled here in the 1600s and remained for 200 years; Morse family headstones may still be seen to this day.

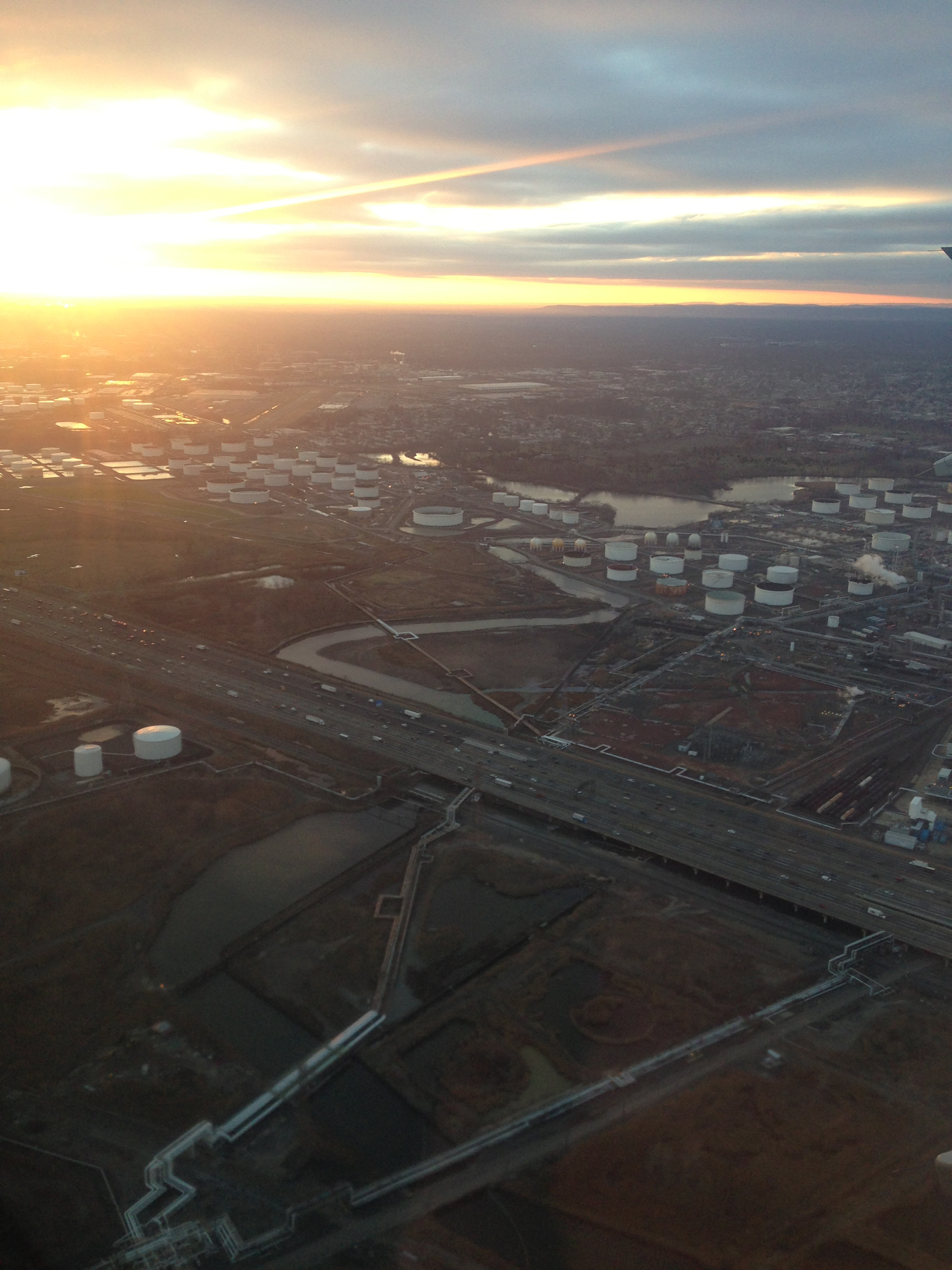
View west up Morses Creek in Linden, New Jersey from a plane heading for Newark Airport (2014)

On its route to the Arthur Kill, it traverses Kenilworth, Cranford, Roselle Park, Roselle, Union and Linden. In Cranford it runs behind Adams Park. It crosses near Roselle Park High School. In Linden and Roselle, it crosses the land of Wheeler Park and Roselle Catholic High School. It bisects the Bayway Refinery on the Chemical Coast. Historically, the land of the lower creek included prosperous tidewater farmland.

== Contamination ==
According to a 2014 Wasting Our Waterways report, the Bayway Refinery dumped over 2 million pounds of toxins in the Arthur Kill via Morses Creek in 2012 alone. Morses Creek is severely contaminated. A battle has erupted over whether Exxon-Mobil as the former owners of the Bayway Refinery are responsible merely for remediation or a full restoration of the waterway. A settlement made with the state of New Jersey allows Exxon-Mobil to postpone clean-up until the current owners, Phillips 66 Partners, sells the facility.

No current plan to clean up Morses Creek exists despite decades of contaminated water and soil.

== Ilya the Morses Creek manatee ==
In 2009, to the surprise of many, a lost Florida manatee named Ilya by researchers was found swimming in Morses Creek. Thought to have sought warmth in the warm water discharged from the Bayway Refinery, he was successfully rescued and returned to the Florida wild.

== See also ==
- List of rivers of New Jersey
- Geography of New York–New Jersey Harbor Estuary
