= Prall's Island =

Uninhabited island in New York, US

Coordinates: 40°36′32″N 74°12′06″W

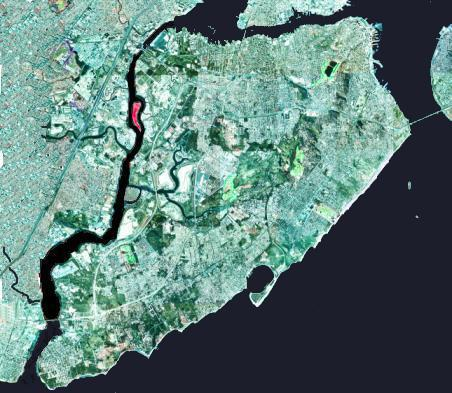
Prall's Island, in the Arthur Kill, is shown in red

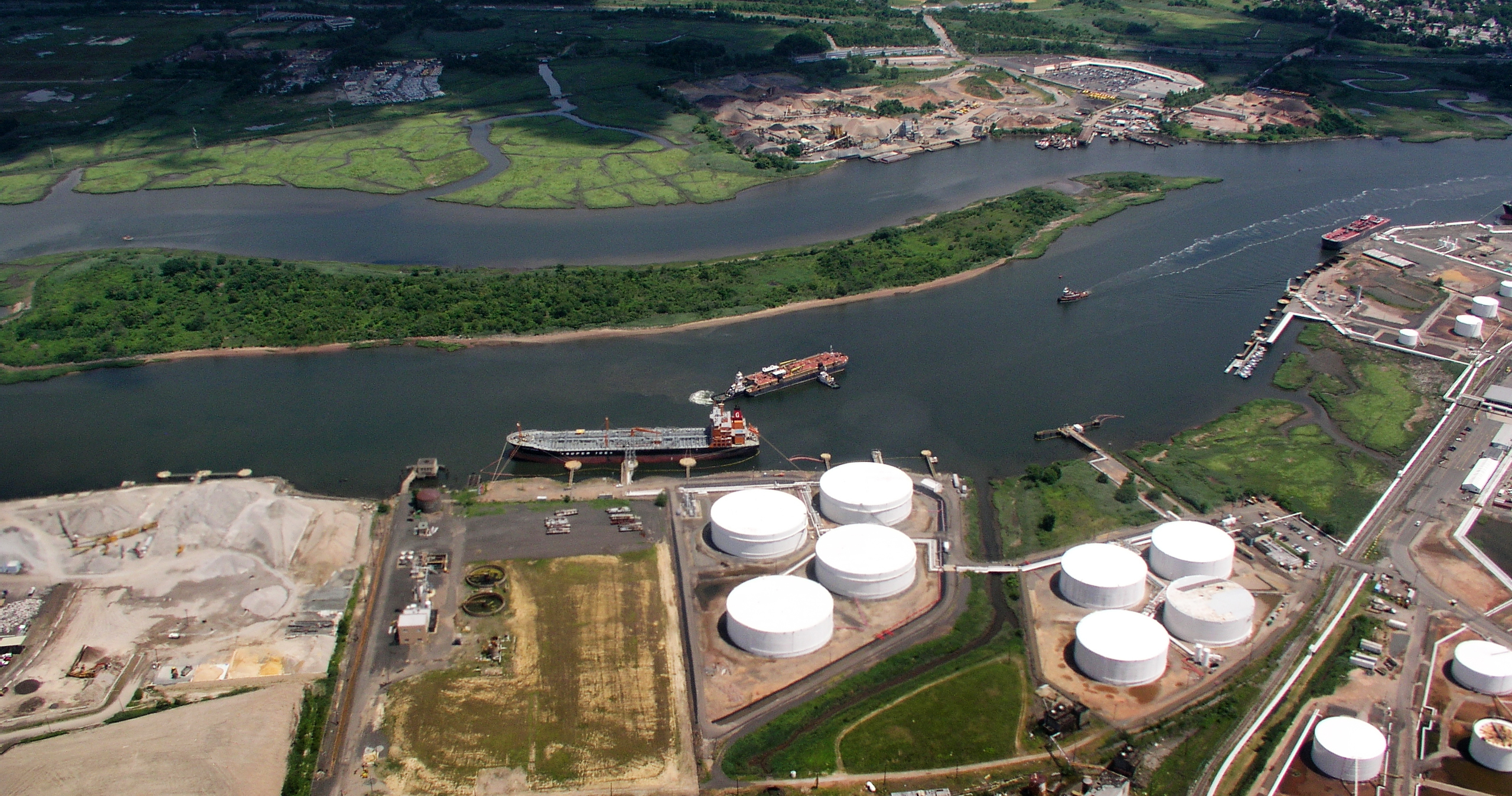
Prall's Island, looking east from New Jersey

Prall's Island is an uninhabited island in the Arthur Kill between Staten Island, New York, and Linden, New Jersey, in the United States. The 89-acre (0.36 km^{2}) island is one of the minor islands that are part of the borough of Staten Island in New York City.

The island is named for a descendant or descendants of early Staten Island settler Arendt Jansen Prall Van Naarden (c. 1647–1725) (in Dutch, Praal), probably his grandson Abraham Prall (1706–1775), a local farmer. It was originally known as "Dongan's Island," after New York Governor Thomas Dongan (1634–1715), who took the office in 1688. This was later corrupted to "Duncan's Island." The name "Prall's Island" did not take hold until the late 19th century. Around 1910, the water between Staten Island and the island was known as "Prall's River" but the name "Arthur Kill" eventually prevailed. The island is now owned by the City of New York and is maintained by New York City Department of Parks and Recreation as a bird sanctuary.

== See also ==
- Geography of New York–New Jersey Harbor Estuary
