= Arthur Kill =

Tidal strait between New York and New Jersey

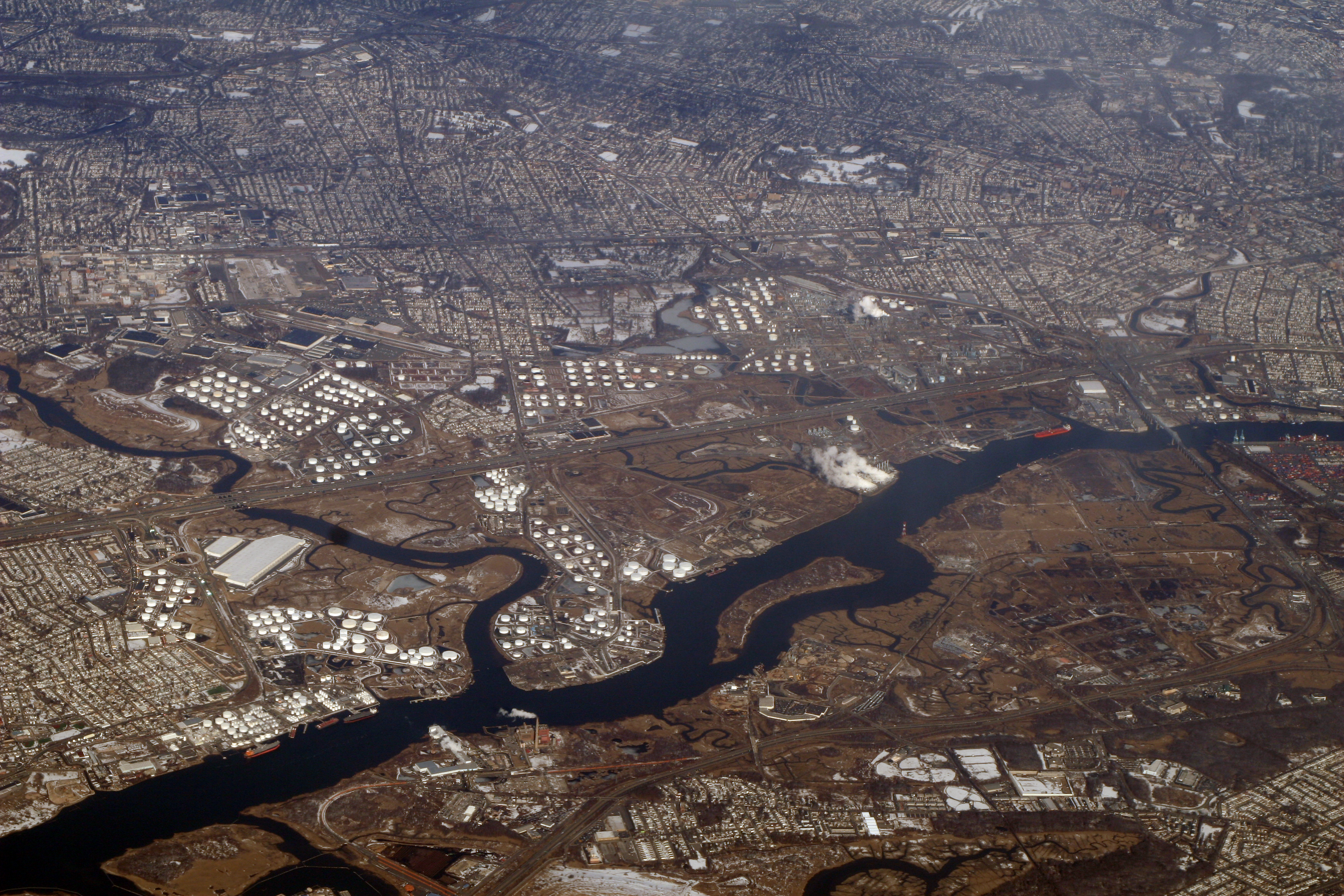
- Aerial view of Arthur Kill, with the Rahway River joining from the left and Prall's Island visible near center.

Location
- Country: United States
- State: New York, New Jersey
- Municipalities: Staten Island (New York), Union County (New Jersey), Middlesex County (New Jersey)

Physical characteristics
- Source: Newark Bay
  - coordinates: 40°38′47″N 74°10′47″W
- Mouth: Raritan Bay
  - coordinates: 40°30′01″N 74°15′31″W

The Arthur Kill (sometimes referred to as the Staten Island Sound) is a tidal strait in the New York–New Jersey Harbor Estuary between Staten Island (also known as Richmond County), New York, and Union and Middlesex counties, New Jersey. It is a major navigational channel of the Port of New York and New Jersey.

== Etymology ==
The name Arthur Kill is an anglicization of the Dutch achter kill meaning back channel, which would refer to its location "behind" Staten Island and has its roots in the early 17th century during the Dutch colonial era when the region was part of New Netherland. Placenaming by early explorers and settlers during the era often referred to a location in reference to other places, its shape, its topography, and other geographic qualities. Kill comes from the Middle Dutch word kille, meaning riverbed, water channel, or stream. The area around the Newark Bay was called Achter Kol. During the British colonial era the bay was known as Cull bay. The bay lies behind Bergen Hill, the emerging ridge of the Hudson Palisades which begins on Bergen Neck, the peninsula between it and the Upper New York Bay. The sister channel of Arthur Kill, Kill van Kull, refers to the waterway that flows from the col or ridge or passage to the interior and translates as channel from the pass or ridge.

== Geography and geology ==
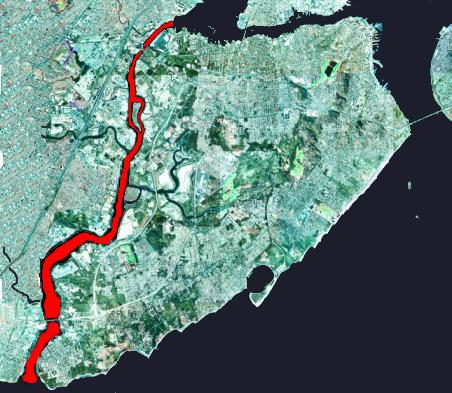
Shown in red, between New Jersey and Staten Island, Arthur Kill connects Raritan Bay on the south with Newark Bay on the north

The channel is approximately 10 miles (16 km) long and connects Raritan Bay on its south end with Newark Bay on the north. Along the New Jersey side it is primarily lined with industrial sites, part of which is called the Chemical Coast. The Staten Island side is primarily lined with salt marshes and is home to the Staten Island boat graveyard. It creates a border for Fresh Kills Landfill and Freshkills Park.

=== Course ===
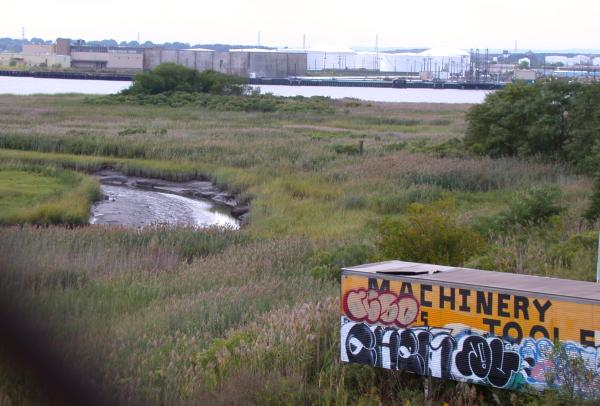
As seen from Staten Island, with Carteret, New Jersey, in the background and small creek in foreground

Arthur Kill is an abandoned river channel carved by an ancestral phase of the Hudson River resulting from the blockage of the main channel of the Hudson at the Narrows by moraine or an ice dam. The size of Arthur Kill channel is large, suggesting that it was, for a time, the primary drainage from the region. However, it could not have been primary drainage for long because the river did not have enough time to carve a broad flood plain.

Because of the complex nature of the tides in New York-New Jersey Harbor Estuary near the mouth of the Hudson River, the hydrology of Arthur Kill is still an open subject. In particular, the net flow of the channel is not well established. It was heavily polluted in the 1960s and 1970s, with few fish species able to live in it. Since the 1990s, crabs, baitfish, striped bass, and bluefish have returned to this water.

=== Tributaries and islands ===
Arthur Kill contains two small uninhabited islands, Prall's Island and the Isle of Meadows, both of which are part of the borough of Staten Island. John's Cove is located near its northern end in New Jersey.

On the New Jersey side, the Elizabeth River, Rahway River, Morses Creek, and Piles Creek flow into the kill. The Passaic River and Hackensack River mouth at Newark Bay. On the Staten Island side, Old Place Creek, Fresh Kills (an estuary fed by the Richmond Creek and Main Creek), Bridge Creek (off Goethal Pond), and Sawmill Creek flow into the estuary.

== Shipping ==
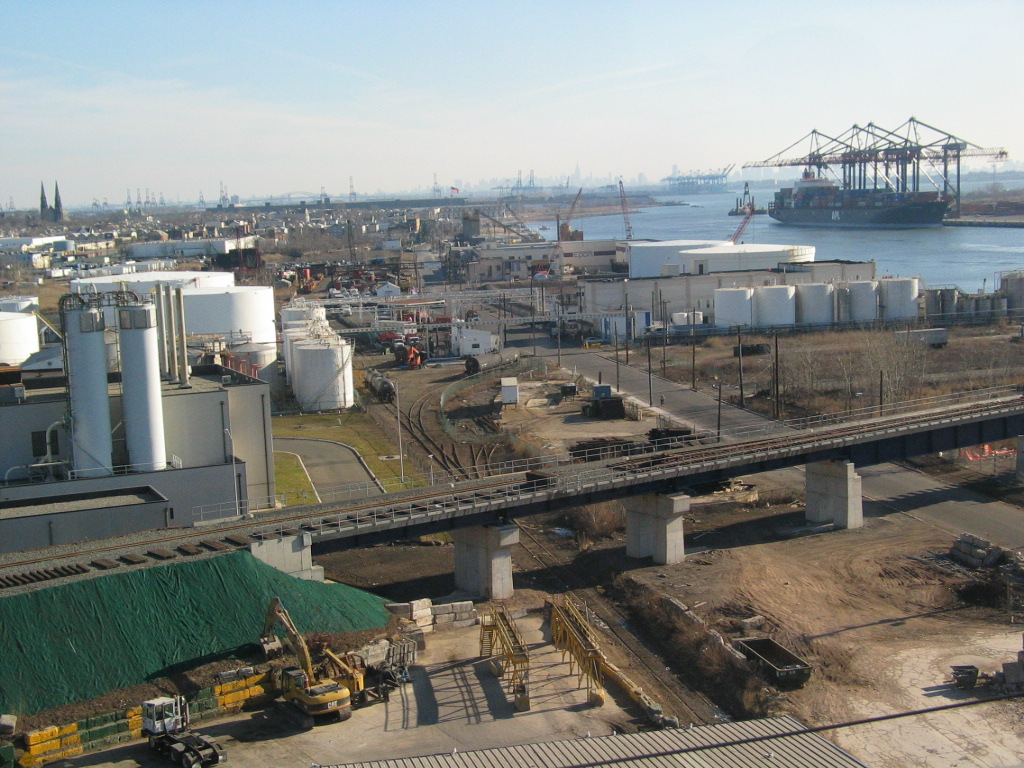
Chemical Coast & Howland Hook

The channel is dredged periodically to a depth of 35 to 37 feet (10.7 to 11.3 m) and a width of 600 feet (180 m) to maintain its usefulness for commercial ship passage. As part of its Harboring Deepening Project, the Kill is being deepened to a depth of 50 feet (15 m) to accommodate larger ships and allow for their passage while carrying full loads.

A heavily used marine channel, it provides access for ocean-going tankers to industrial facilities along the channel itself. The Howland Hook Marine Terminal is located at its mouth at Newark Bay. It provided the primary marine access to the now-closed Fresh Kills Landfill on Staten Island and is the location of the Staten Island boat graveyard. The Arthur Kill Terminal is a proposed offshore wind port.

== Crossings ==
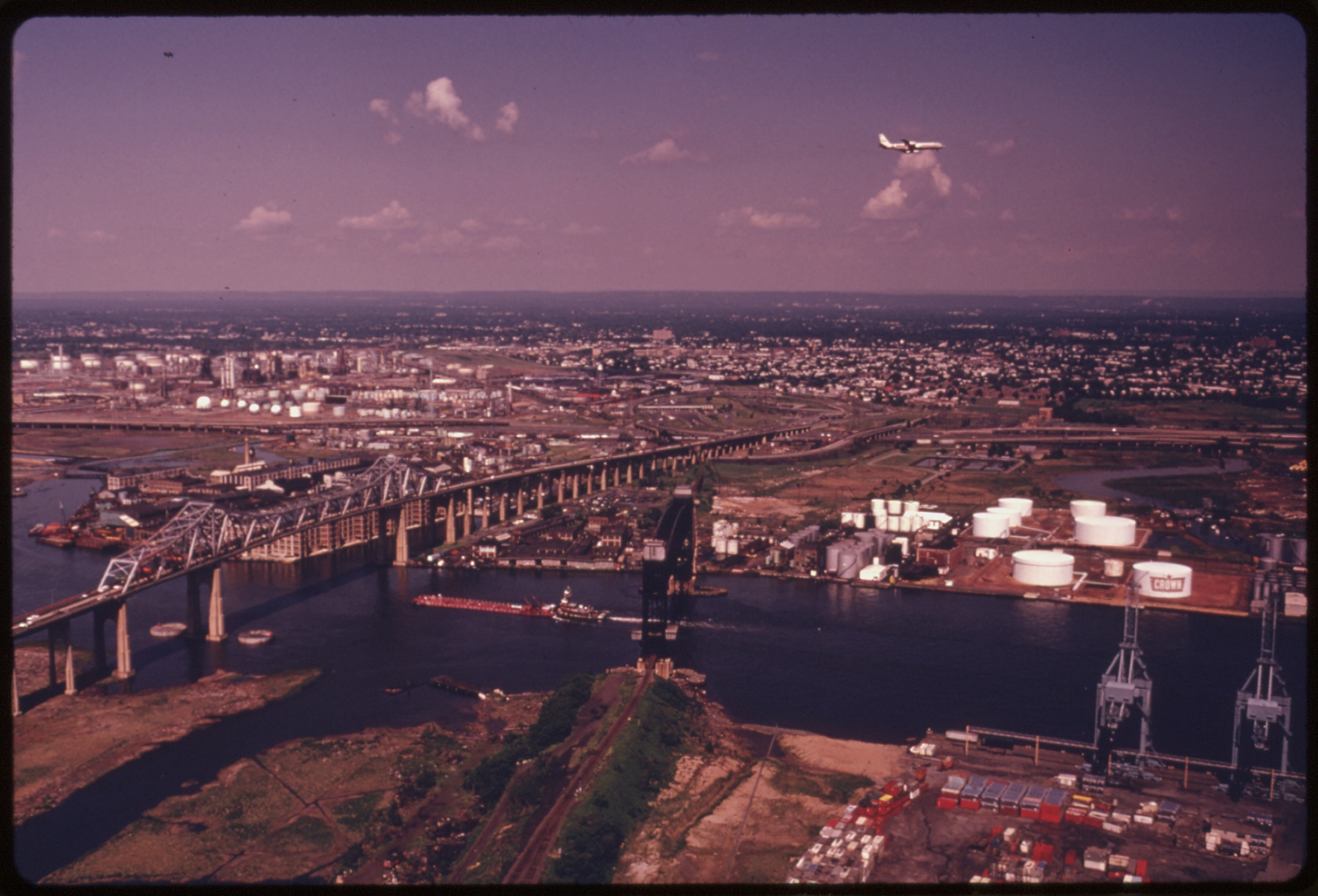
Crossed by Goethals and Arthur Kill Vertical Lift bridges

Arthur Kill is spanned by the Goethals Bridge and the Outerbridge Crossing, as well as by the Arthur Kill Vertical Lift Bridge, a railroad bridge and the largest bridge of its type in the United States.

For many years the Kill was traversed by a ferry between Tottenville and the Perth Amboy Ferry Slip. Another ferry ran from the tip of Victory Boulevard in Travis to Carteret. Re-introduction ferry service between Carteret's Waterfront Park and Midtown Manhattan via Arthur Kill and Kill van Kull is planned. As of 2021, funding for the construction of a landing dock and purchase of a boat was in place.

Groundbreaking for the new ferry terminal in Carteret, valued at $48 million, occurred on December 12, 2025 with the contract going to Brockwell and Carrington Contracts of the Towaco section of Montville, New Jersey.

== History ==
The Arthur Kill was a critical dividing line during the American Revolution, with the British holding Staten Island for the duration of the conflict while New Jersey remained largely in Continental hands. Numerous skirmishes, including the Battle of Staten Island, spanned the Arthur Kill.

The Pilgrim Pipeline, to pipe crude oil, kerosene, and diesel fuel through New York and New Jersey was proposed to terminate at the Linden side of the kill.

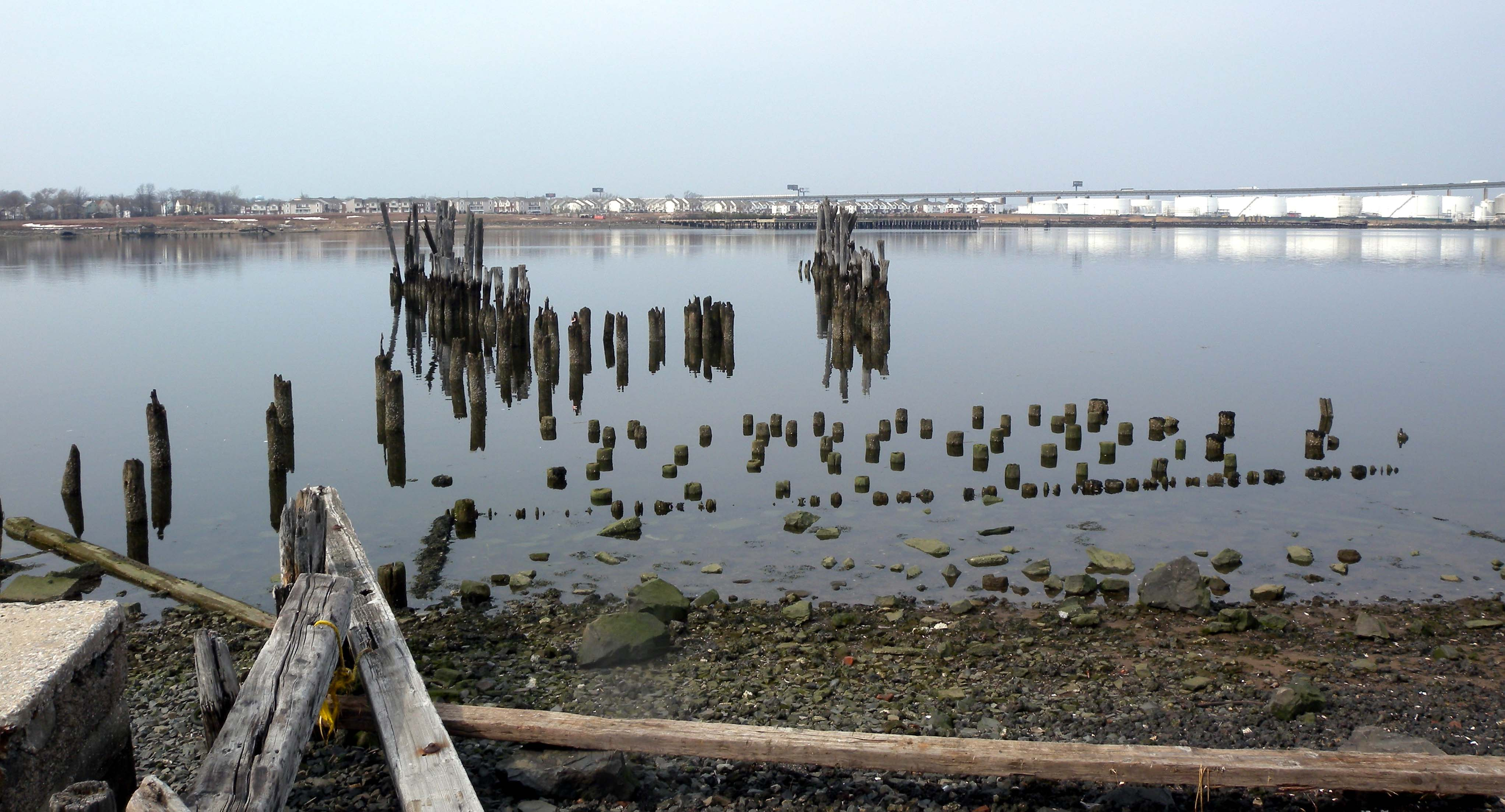
View from Tottenville, Staten Island to Perth Amboy, New Jersey

== See also ==
- Achter Col, New Netherland and Toponymy of New Netherland
- List of New Jersey rivers
- Lower New York Bay
- Hudson Canyon
