= Sediment trap (geology) =

Any topographic depression where sediments substantially accumulate over time

In geology, a sediment trap is any topographic depression where sediments substantially accumulate over time. The size of a sediment trap can vary from a small lagoon to a large basin such as the Persian Gulf.
