= Bayway Refinery =

Oil refining facility in the Port of New York and New Jersey, United States

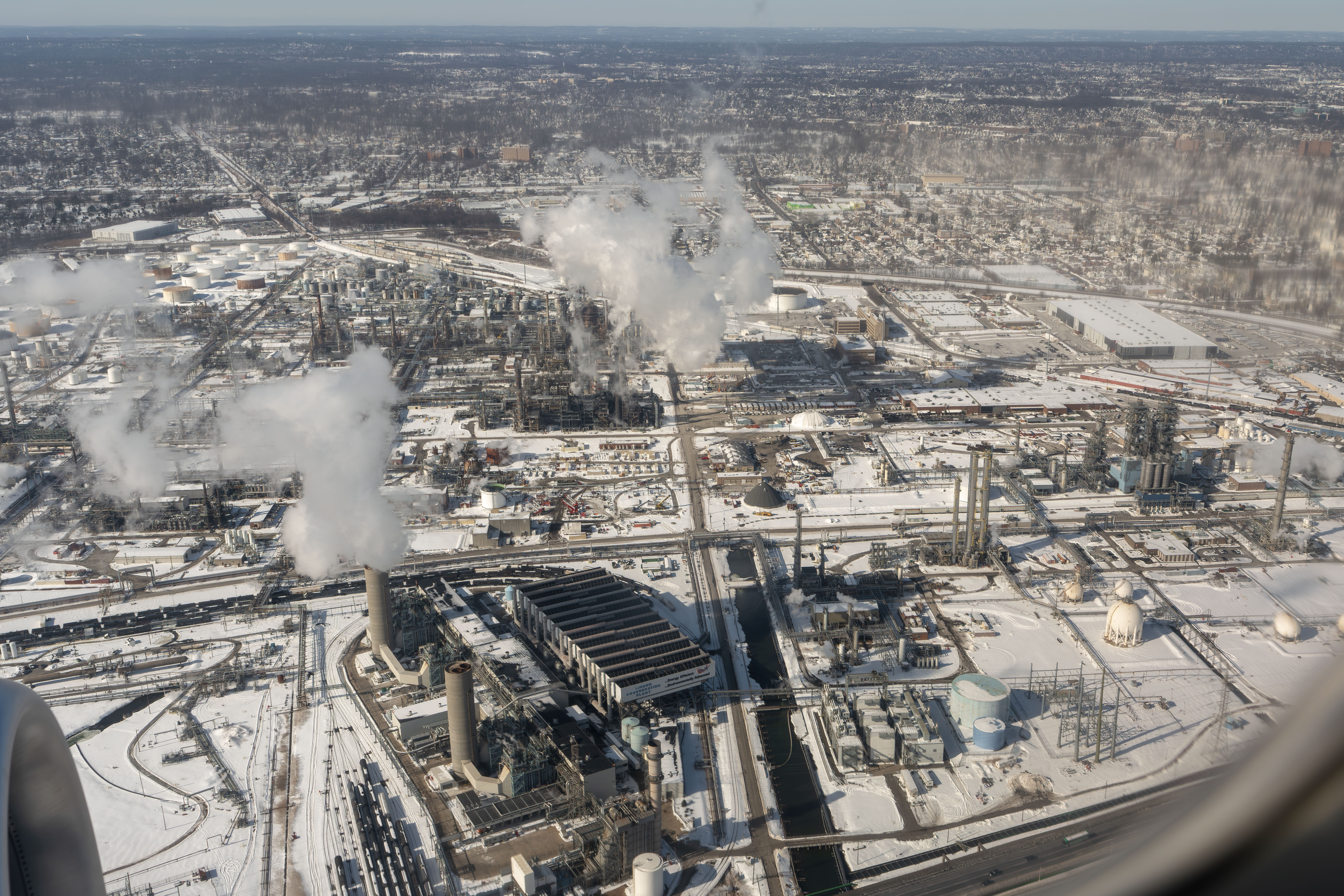
- Aerial view in 2026

- Location of the Bayway Refinery Bayway Refinery (New Jersey) Bayway Refinery (the United States)
- Location: Linden, New Jersey, United States; 40.637193°N 74.214449°W

Refinery details
- Owner: Phillips 66
- Opened: 1909; 117 years ago
- Capacity: 285,000 barrels per day (45,300 m^{3}/d)
- Complexity index: 8.1
- No. of employees: 695
- Website: Bayway Refinery

Bayway Refinery is a refining facility in the Port of New York and New Jersey, owned by Phillips 66. Located in Linden, New Jersey along the border with Elizabeth, and bisected by Morses Creek, it is the northernmost refinery on the East Coast of the United States. The oil refinery converts crude oil (supplied by tanker ships from the North Sea, Canada and West Africa and by rail from the Bakken Formation in North Dakota) into gasoline, diesel fuel, jet fuel, propane and heating oil. As of 2007, the facility processed approximately 238,000 bbl/d (37,800 m^{3}/d) of crude oil, producing 145,000 bbl/d (23,100 m^{3}/d) of gasoline and 110,000 bbl/d (17,000 m^{3}/d) of distillates. Its products are delivered to East Coast customers via pipeline transport, barges, railcars and tank trucks.

The facility also houses a petrochemical plant which produces lubricants and additives and a polypropylene plant that produces over 775 million pounds of polypropylene per year. The refinery has its own railway container terminal and heliport.

The workers at the plant have been unionized under the International Brotherhood of Teamsters (Local No. 877) since 1960.

The refinery has had and continues to have environmental issues, culminating in the major $225 million Exxon Mobil-New Jersey Environmental Contamination settlement. A 2010 investigative report conducted by WABC-TV, the ABC flagship station in New York City, characterizes the Bayway Refinery as a "repeat offender" of environmental regulations.

== History ==
In 1907, Standard Oil founder John D. Rockefeller acquired several hundred acres of the former Morse family estate between Linden and Elizabeth, New Jersey as the site for his latest refinery. Construction of temporary office buildings began on October 15, 1907 and work clearing the heavily wooded land began immediately. The cornerstone of the machine shop, the first permanent structure at the site, was laid on January 18, 1908, and construction continued throughout the year. The first crude stills at Bayway were completed in late 1908 and on January 2, 1909, they were symbolically fired up by William C. Koehler (c1880-1953). The facility began processing an initial 10,000 barrels (1,600 m^{3}) of crude oil per day. Capacity was expanded to an estimated 17,176 barrels per day (2,730.8 m^{3}/d) by 1911. Over the next several years the plant continued expanding and increasing capacity and workforce.

In 1911, Standard Oil was broken up into smaller units in accordance with the Sherman Antitrust Act. One of these successor companies was Standard Oil Company of New Jersey, the precursor to Esso and later Exxon, which retained the ownership of the Bayway facilities.

Bayway became a leading research facility within the S.O. New Jersey enterprise. It was the first facility in the United States to employ the use of hydrogenation process to get greater yields from its crude products, and in 1919 scientists at Bayway created the world's first petrochemical: isopropyl alcohol.

The Ethyl Corporation, a joint venture of General Motors and Standard Oil, built a plant for the manufacture of tetraethyl lead (TEL, the "lead" in leaded gasoline) at the refinery over the course of three months in 1924. Within the first two months of its operation, the facility had seventeen cases of severe lead poisoning leading to hallucinations and insanity, and then five deaths in quick succession. The plant was shut down by the state of New Jersey in October, and Standard Oil was forbidden to manufacture TEL there again without state permission.

During World War II, the plant constructed its first catalytic cracker, or "cat cracker", which went into operation on January 18, 1943. This development proved essential to the production of fuel to support the Allied war effort, especially high-octane aviation fuel, and also allowed the production of synthetic butyl rubber and materials used to manufacture explosives.

After the war, the use of coal for heating declined sharply in the United States. In 1947, Esso invested $26 million in a refinery expansion program to meet an increased post-war demand for gasoline and heating oil, and constructed a second, much larger catalytic cracker with an initial processing capacity of 49,000 bbl/d (7,800 m^{3}/d), replacing the original 1943 unit. The "Cat" came online in October 1949 and was the largest in the world during the twentieth century, and as of 2008 was the largest in the western hemisphere.

In 1965 Enjay Chemical, a subsidiary of the Esso Chemical Company (which later became Exxon Chemical) in the Standard Oil Company New Jersey (known publicly mostly by the Esso, Enco and Humble brands) assumed all of the chemical processing assets and products at Bayway. In 1973, the Standard Oil Company of New Jersey was renamed Exxon, and the facility likewise became known as the Exxon Bayway Refinery.

On the night of December 5, 1970 a series of powerful explosions occurred at the refinery, resulting in multiple injuries but no fatalities in and around the plant. Windows were shattered as far away as Staten Island, and the explosion was felt more than thirty miles away.

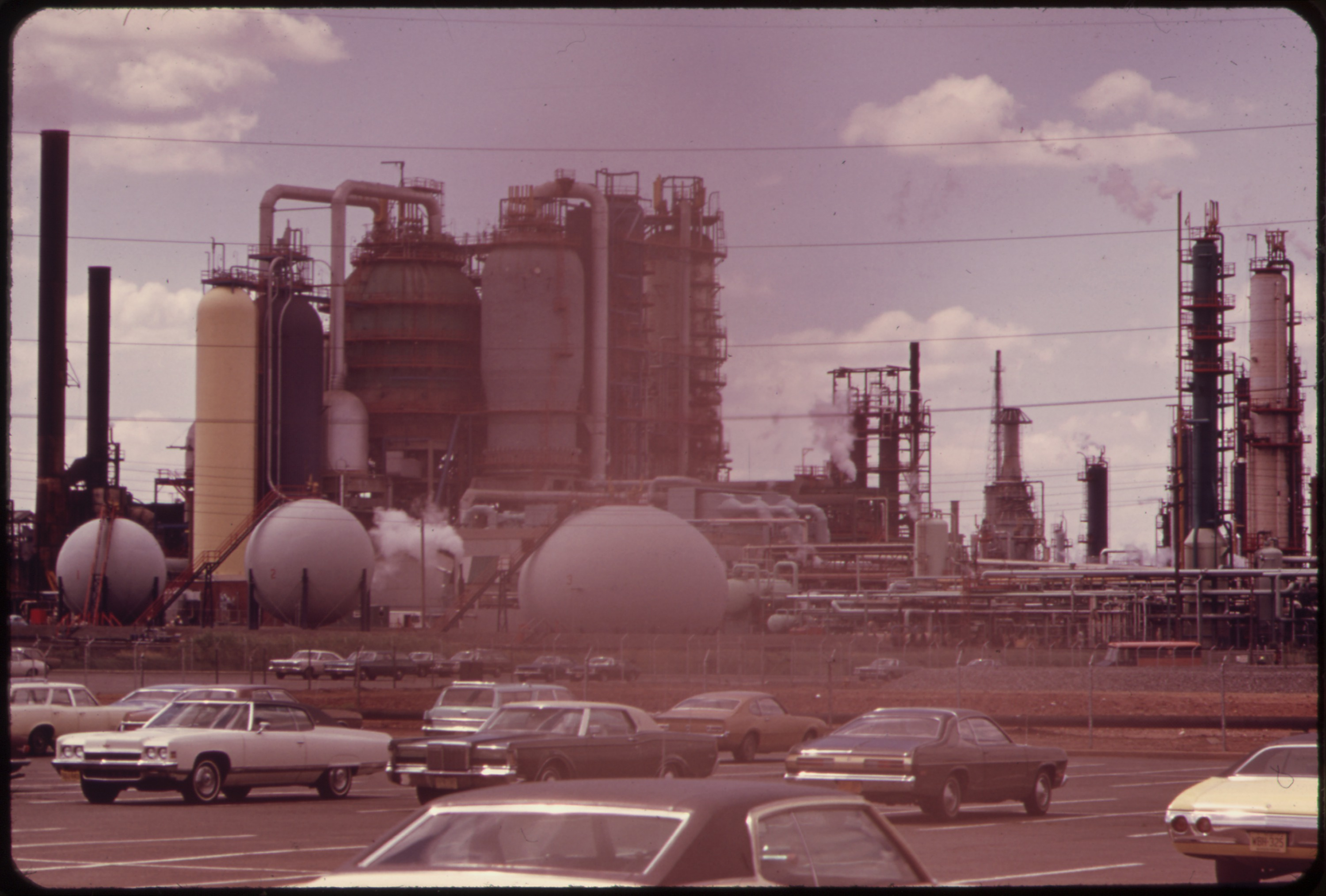
Portion of the Bayway Refinery as seen in 1973

1976 brought about the installation of a remarkable structure at the refinery, the Wet Gas Scrubber. Visible from the New Jersey Turnpike with its plumes of water vapor, this device removes 7-8 tons of dust per day as well as gases generated from the catalytic cracking process.

In 1979, another "massive early morning explosion and fire at an Exxon refinery in Linden, N.J., injured seven persons, two seriously, and shook buildings four miles away" including the destruction of a process unit.

On the night of January 1–2, 1990, a cracked underwater pipeline leaked about 567,000 US gallons (2,150 m^{3}) of fuel oil into the Arthur Kill. Because the waterway was already so heavily industrialized, Exxon argued that it should not have to pay any damages. The court disagreed, ordering the company to pay $15 million in reparations.

On April 8, 1993, the Tosco Corporation finalized proceedings to purchase the refinery from Exxon for a sum of $175 million, although the Exxon Chemical Company continued to run the Chemical Plant. During this time Bayway was operated by Bayway Refining Company, a wholly owned subsidiary of the Tosco Corporation. Under the direction of Tosco, Bayway was able to reorganize and upgrade the facility, and years of operating at a loss for Exxon in the later 1980s were turned around swiftly.

The Morristown and Erie Railway became the contract switcher for the refinery in 1995, and set up the Bayshore Terminal Company to handle the management of 8,000 railroad cars full of various refinery products each year.

In 1999, the Infineum company (a joint project of Exxon Chemical, Shell International Chemicals and Shell Chemical) took over operation of the chemical plant. Infineum researches and produces crankcase lubricant additives, fuel additives, and specialty lubricant additives, as well as automatic transmission fluids, gear oils, and industrial oils.

Tosco was bought in 2001 by Phillips Petroleum, which merged with Conoco to form ConocoPhillips in 2002 and later spun off downstream, midstream and chemical assets into a new Phillips 66 company in 2012.

In 2003 a new polypropylene facility went online that produces 775 million pounds per year.

== Units ==
2023 Unit Capacities from the AFPM Survey (also doubles as the US Government EIA Refinery Capacity Survey):

Unit	Capacity in bpcd
Atmospheric Distillation	258,500
Vacuum Distillation	75,000
FCCU	145,000
Naphtha Reforming	37,000
Solvent Deasphalting	22,000
Naphtha Hydrotreating	65,500
Diesel Hydrotreating	108,000
Other Distillate Hydrotreating	17,500
Alkylation	18,800
Isobutane Isomerization	4,000
Hydrogen mmscf/d	22

Bayway's FCCU is integrated with an onsite polypropylene unit of 775 million lbs per year capacity.

== Environmental issues ==
The refinery was the famous toxic site in question in the 2015 legal settlement between New Jersey and ExxonMobil. In late 2003, the refinery came under scrutiny for a possibly abnormal cancer rate among its work population. As a result, local ABC affiliate WABC-TV (Channel 7), New York, ran a feature about the refinery. The refinery has since been subject to scrutiny by the New Jersey Department of Environmental Protection and the Occupational Safety and Health Administration (OSHA).

The refinery has consistently been ranked among the worst polluters in the nation, and has been cited almost 200 times since 2005 for violation of state environmental laws. It is also ranked as the 32nd worst water polluter in the country.

=== 2005 environmental control measures ===
Thanks to the terms of a settlement with the Department of Environmental Protection, ConocoPhillips stated that it would take the following actions at their Bayway facilities:

- Install a cover on the wastewater separator or a new covered separator, and controls, by December 2008. This measure, which would cost approximately $8 million, would reduce emissions of volatile organic compounds, (VOCs) at the treatment unit by 95 percent.
- Install a new fuel gas system by December 2010 to burn cleaner natural gas instead of fuel oil, reducing SO2 emissions by thousands of tons per year. This would cost $28 million to $38 million.
- Install new pollution controls on heaters and boilers by December 2010 at cost of $20 million, reducing annual NOx emissions by approximately 900 tons.
- Reduce emissions of VOCs by implementing an enhanced leak detection and repair program.
- Reduce VOC and acid gas emissions by minimizing flaring.
- Audit and reduce benzene emissions.

== See also ==
- Big Inch
- List of oil refineries
- Perth Amboy Refinery
- Port Reading Refinery
- Morses Creek
- The Chemical Coast
