= Sediment =

Particulate solid matter deposited on a planetary surface

River Tiber discharging sediment into the sea

In Earth and planetary sciences, sediment is a solid material made of loose particles that is transported to a new location where it is deposited. It occurs naturally and, through the processes of weathering and erosion, is broken down and subsequently transported by the action of wind, water, or ice or by the force of gravity acting on the particles. For example, sand and silt can be carried in suspension in river water and on reaching the sea bed deposited by sedimentation; if buried, they may eventually become sandstone and siltstone (sedimentary rocks) through lithification.

Sediments are most often transported by water (fluvial processes), but also wind (aeolian processes) and glaciers. Beach sands and river channel deposits are examples of fluvial transport and deposition, though sediment also often settles out of slow-moving or standing water in lakes and oceans. Desert sand dunes and loess are examples of aeolian transport and deposition. Glacial moraine deposits and till are ice-transported sediments.

== Classification ==
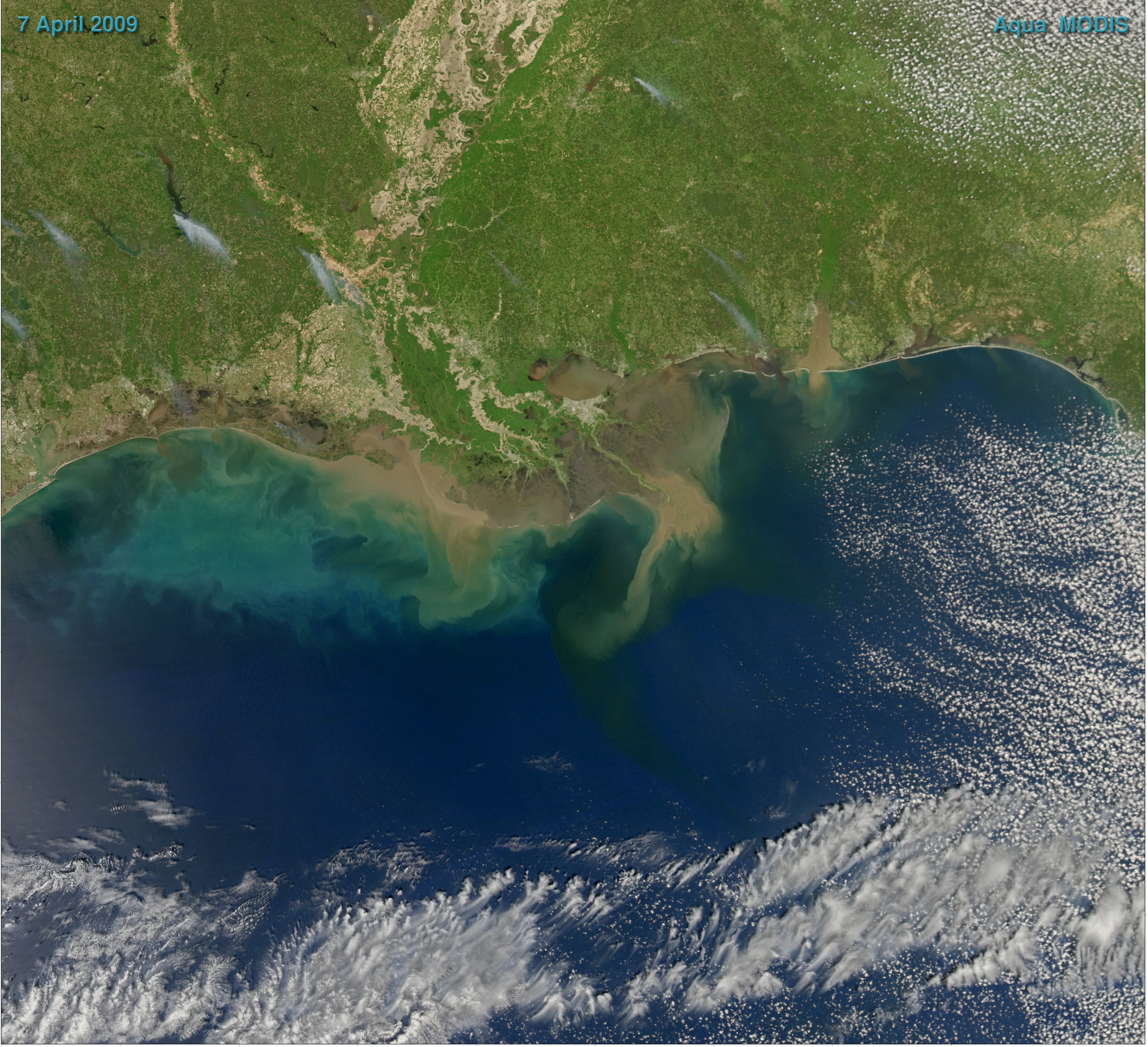
Sediment in the Gulf of Mexico

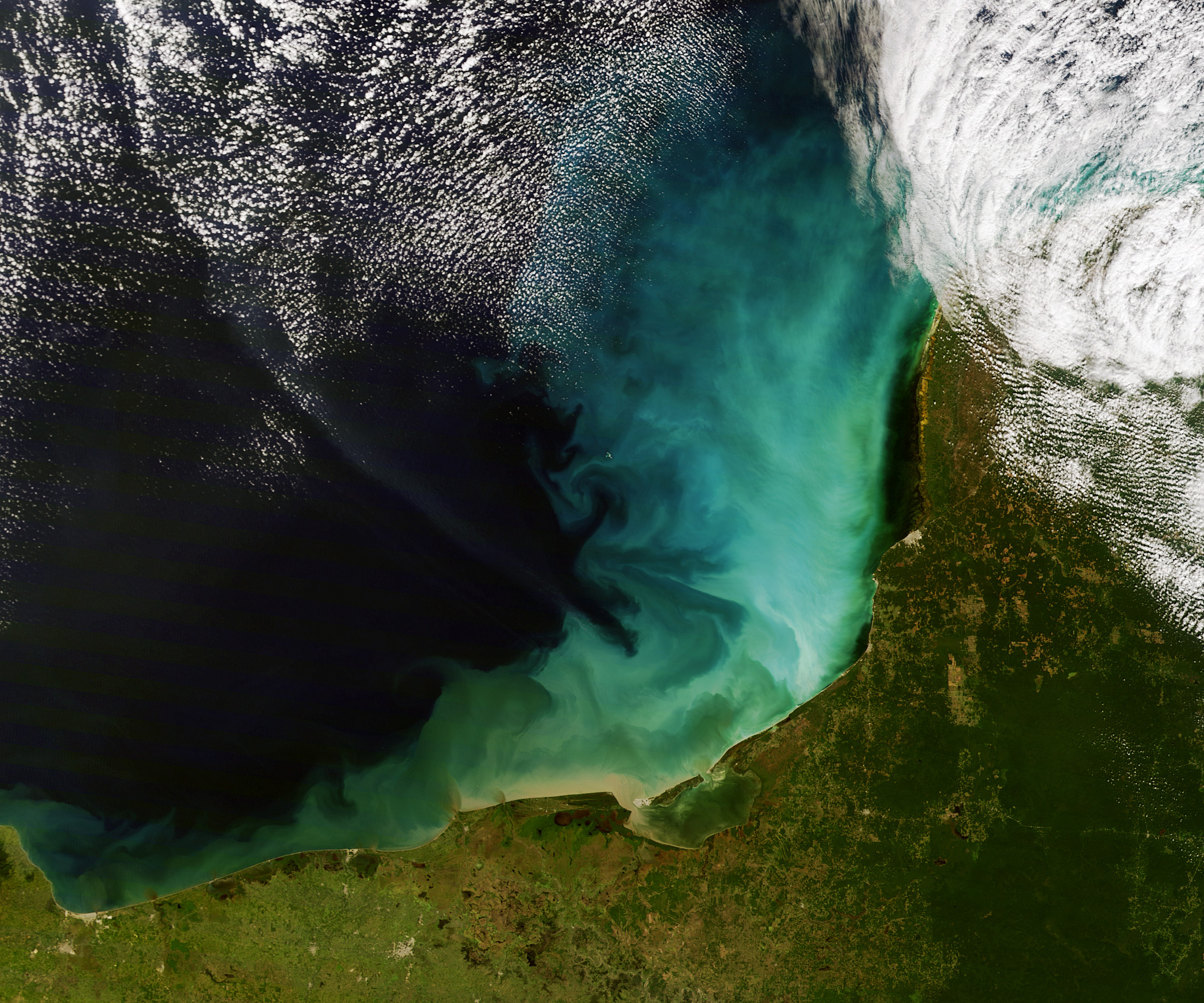
Sediment off the Yucatán Peninsula

Sediment can be classified based on its grain size, grain shape, and composition.

=== Grain size ===
Sediment size is measured on a log base 2 scale, called the "Phi" scale, which classifies particles by size from "colloid" to "boulder".

φ scale	Size range (metric)	Size range (inches)	Aggregate class (Wentworth)	Other names
< −8	> 256 mm	> 10.1 in	Boulder	
−6 to −8	64–256 mm	2.5–10.1 in	Cobble	
−5 to −6	32–64 mm	1.26–2.5 in	Very coarse gravel	Pebble
−4 to −5	16–32 mm	0.63–1.26 in	Coarse gravel	Pebble
−3 to −4	8–16 mm	0.31–0.63 in	Medium gravel	Pebble
−2 to −3	4–8 mm	0.157–0.31 in	Fine gravel	Pebble
−1 to −2	2–4 mm	0.079–0.157 in	Very fine gravel	Granule
0 to −1	1–2 mm	0.039–0.079 in	Very coarse sand	
1 to 0	0.5–1 mm	0.020–0.039 in	Coarse sand	
2 to 1	0.25–0.5 mm	0.010–0.020 in	Medium sand	
3 to 2	125–250 μm	0.0049–0.010 in	Fine sand	
4 to 3	62.5–125 μm	0.0025–0.0049 in	Very fine sand	
8 to 4	3.9–62.5 μm	0.00015–0.0025 in	Silt	Mud
> 8	< 3.9 μm	< 0.00015 in	Clay	Mud
> 10	< 1 μm	< 0.000039 in	Colloid	Mud

=== Shape ===
Schematic representation of difference in grain shape. Two parameters are shown: sphericity (vertical) and rounding (horizontal).

The shape of particles can be defined in terms of three parameters. The form is the overall shape of the particle, with common descriptions being spherical, platy, or rodlike. The roundness is a measure of how sharp grain corners are. This varies from well-rounded grains with smooth corners and edges to poorly rounded grains with sharp corners and edges. Finally, surface texture describes small-scale features such as scratches, pits, or ridges on the surface of the grain.

==== Form ====
Form (also called sphericity) is determined by measuring the size of the particle on its major axes. William C. Krumbein proposed formulas for converting these numbers to a single measure of form, such as

$$\psi_l = \sqrt[3]{\frac{D_S D_I}{D_L^2}}$$

where $D_L$, $D_I$, and $D_S$ are the long, intermediate, and short axis lengths of the particle. The form $\psi_l$ varies from 1 for a perfectly spherical particle to very small values for a platelike or rodlike particle.

An alternate measure was proposed by Sneed and Folk:

$$\psi_p = \sqrt[3]{\frac{D_S^2}{D_L D_I}}$$

which, again, varies from 0 to 1 with increasing sphericity.

==== Roundness ====
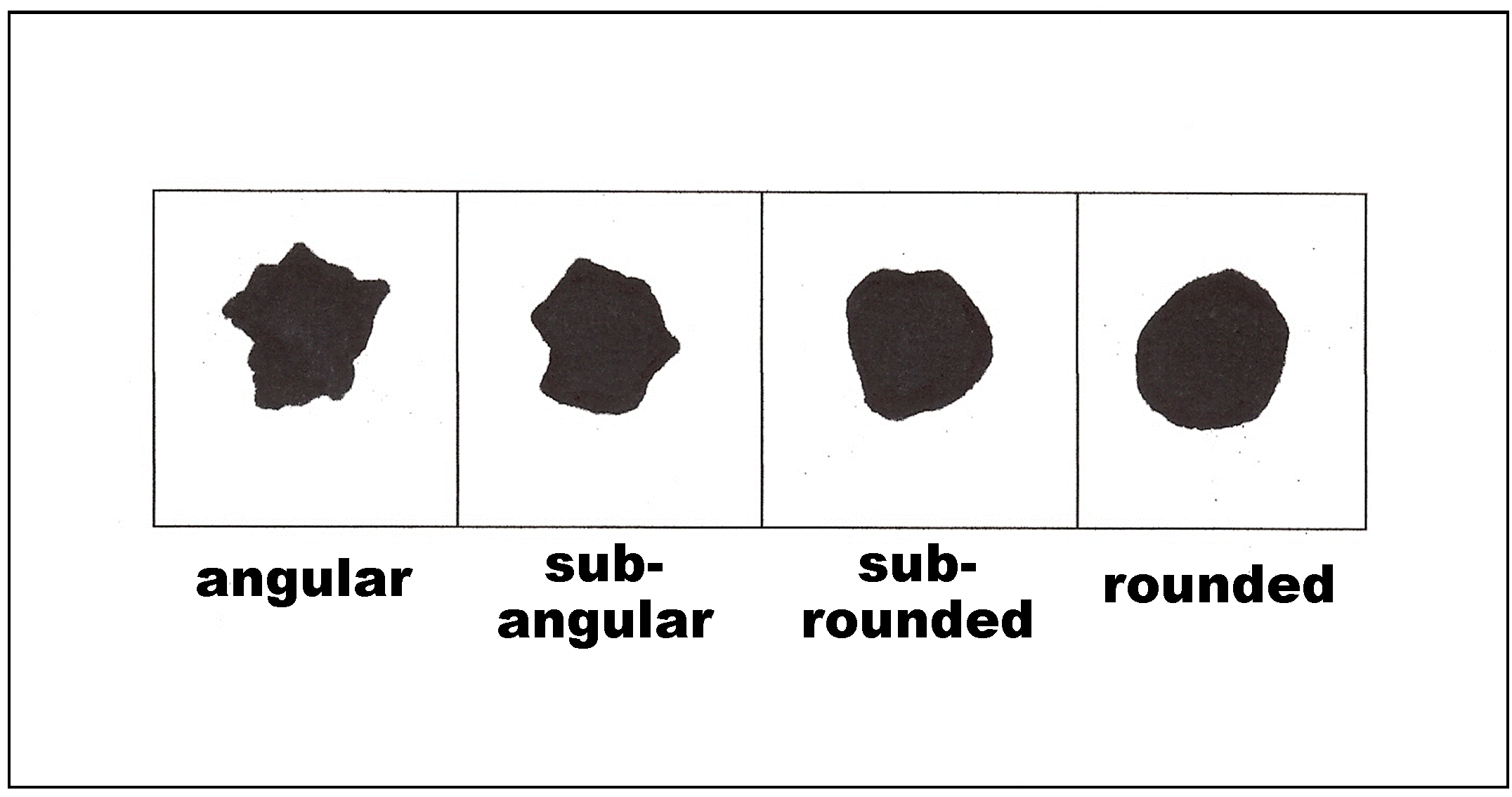
Comparison chart for evaluating roundness of sediment grains

Roundness describes how sharp the edges and corners of particle are. Complex mathematical formulas have been devised for its precise measurement, but these are difficult to apply, and most geologists estimate roundness from comparison charts. Common descriptive terms range from very angular to angular to subangular to subrounded to rounded to very rounded, with increasing degree of roundness.

==== Surface texture ====
Surface texture describes the small-scale features of a grain, such as pits, fractures, ridges, and scratches. These are most commonly evaluated on quartz grains, because these retain their surface markings for long periods of time. Surface texture varies from polished to frosted, and can reveal the history of transport of the grain; for example, frosted grains are particularly characteristic of aeolian sediments, transported by wind. Evaluation of these features often requires the use of a scanning electron microscope.

=== Composition ===
Composition of sediment can be measured in terms of:

- Parent rock lithology
- Mineral composition
- Chemical make-up

This leads to an ambiguity in which clay can be used as both a size-range and a composition (see clay minerals).

== Sediment transport ==
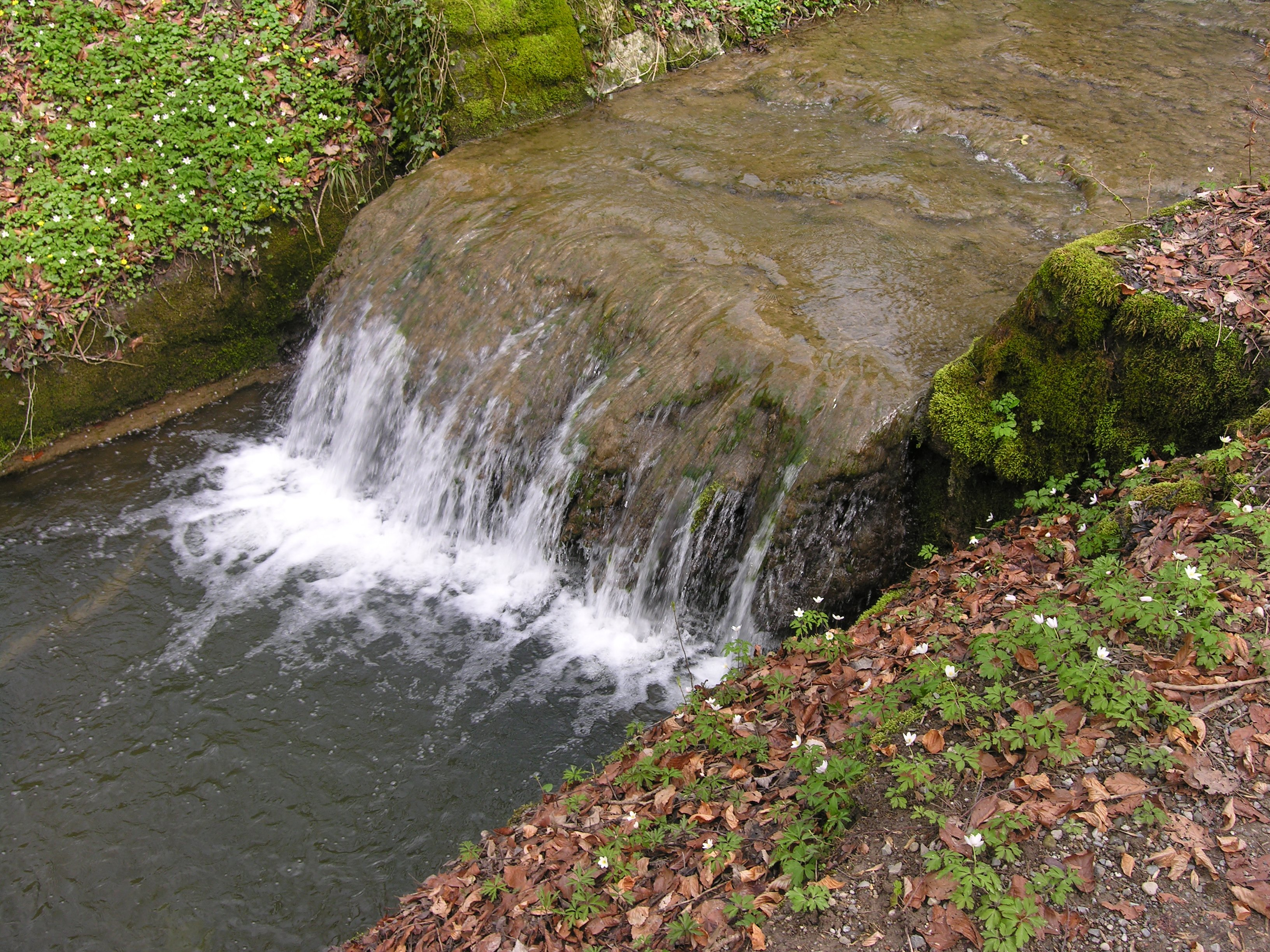
Sediment builds up on human-made breakwaters because they reduce the speed of water flow, so the stream cannot carry as much sediment load.

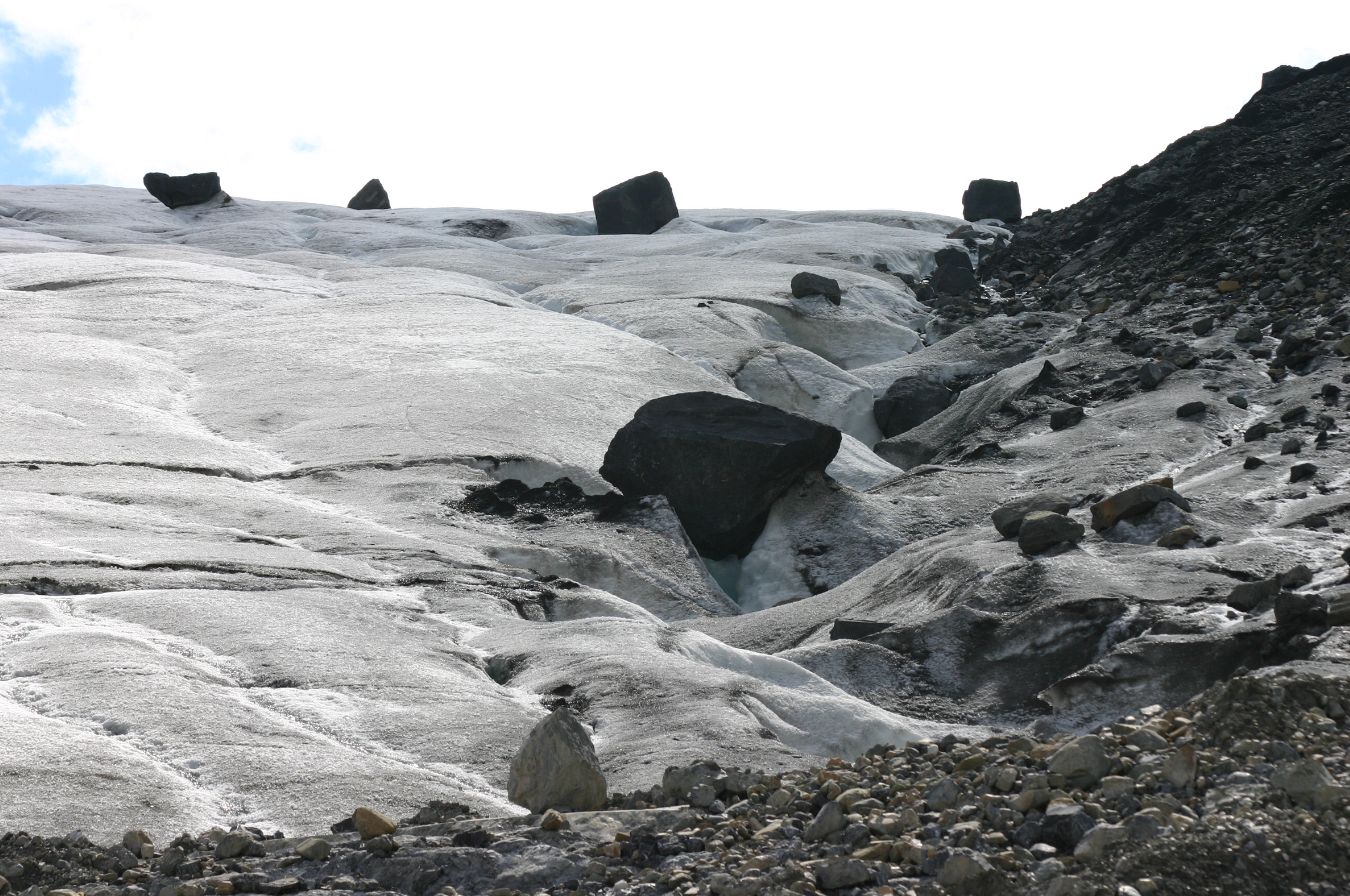
Glacial transport of boulders. These boulders will be deposited as the glacier retreats.

Sediment is transported based on the strength of the flow that carries it and its own size, volume, density, and shape. Stronger flows will increase the lift and drag on the particle, causing it to rise, while larger or denser particles will be more likely to fall through the flow.

=== Fluvial processes ===
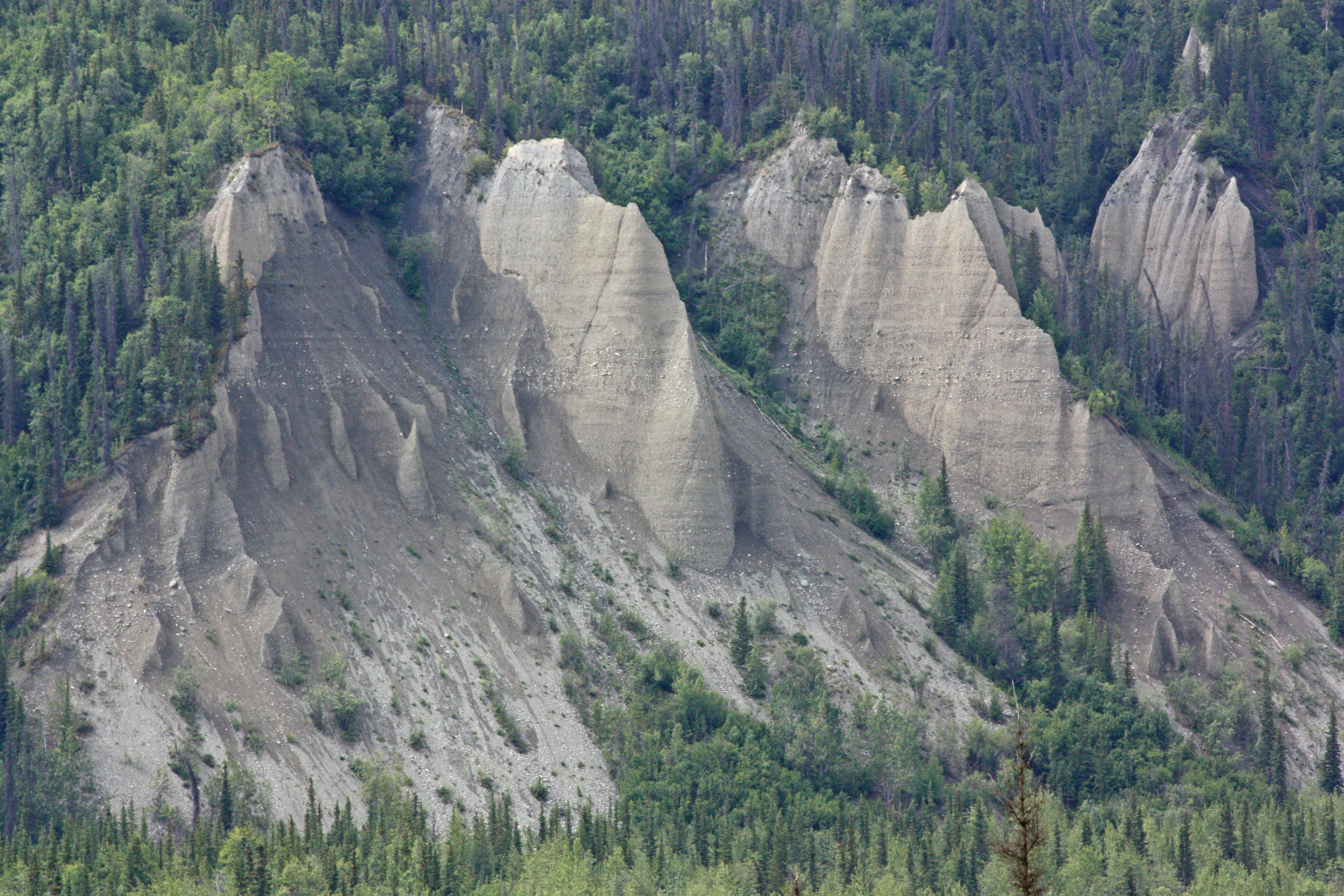
Deep, eroding glaciofluvial deposits alongside the Matanuska River, Alaska

In geography and geology, fluvial sediment processes or fluvial sediment transport are associated with rivers and streams and the deposits and landforms created by sediments. It can result in the formation of ripples and dunes, in fractal-shaped patterns of erosion, in complex patterns of natural river systems, and in the development of floodplains and the occurrence of flash floods. Sediment moved by water can be larger than sediment moved by air because water has both a higher density and viscosity. In typical rivers the largest carried sediment is of sand and gravel size, but larger floods can carry cobbles and even boulders. When the stream or rivers are associated with glaciers, ice sheets, or ice caps, the term glaciofluvial or fluvioglacial is used, as in periglacial flows and glacial lake outburst floods. Fluvial sediment processes include the motion of sediment and erosion or deposition on the river bed.

=== Aeolian processes: wind ===
Wind results in the transportation of fine sediment and the formation of sand dune fields and soils from airborne dust.

=== Glacial processes ===
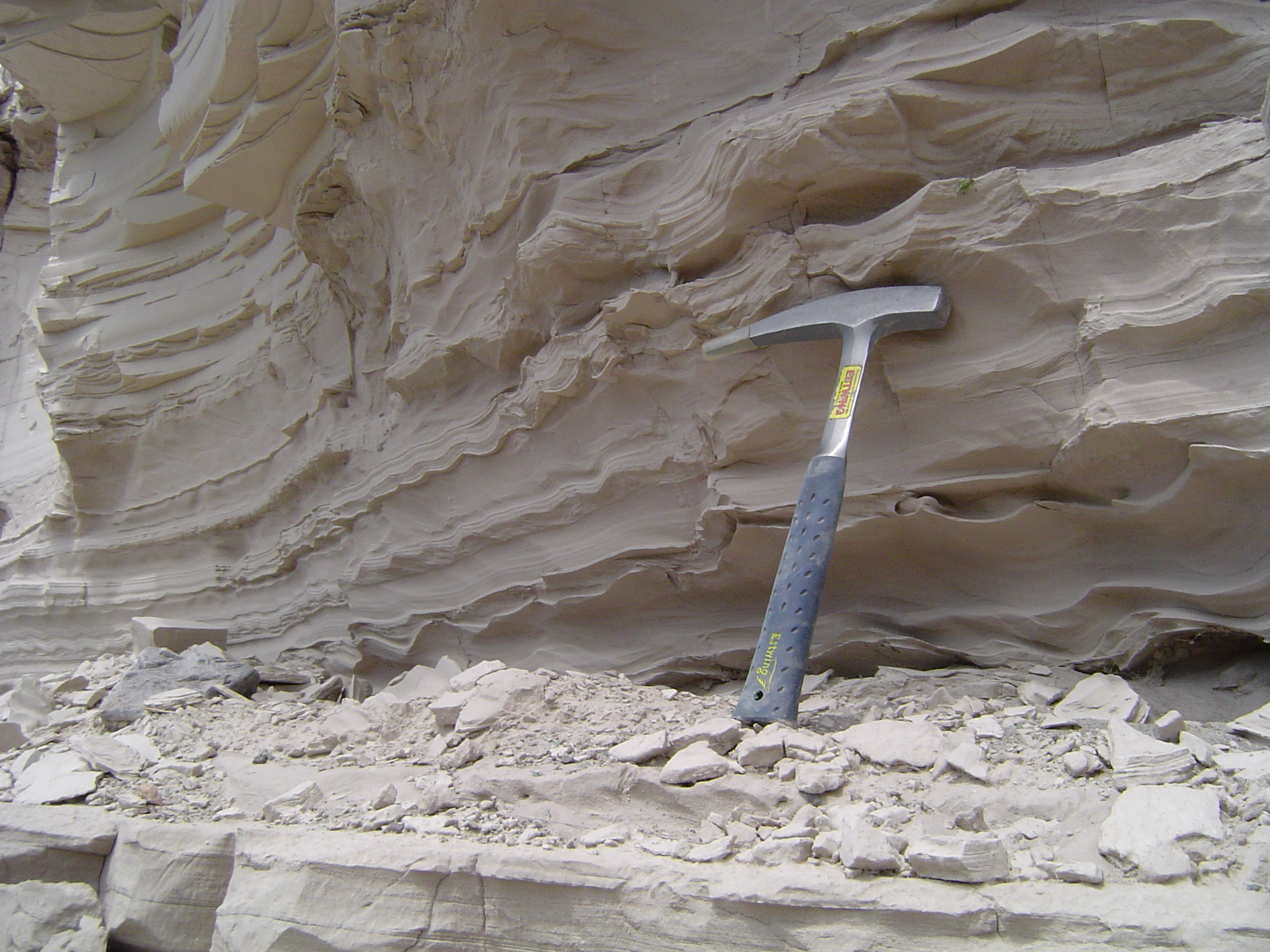
Glacial sediments from Montana

Glaciers carry a wide range of sediment sizes, and deposit it in moraines.

=== Mass balance ===
The overall balance between sediment in transport and sediment being deposited on the bed is given by the Exner equation. This expression states that the rate of increase in bed elevation due to deposition is proportional to the amount of sediment that falls out of the flow. This equation is important in that changes in the power of the flow change the ability of the flow to carry sediment, and this is reflected in the patterns of erosion and deposition observed throughout a stream. This can be localized, and simply due to small obstacles; examples are scour holes behind boulders, where flow accelerates, and deposition on the inside of meander bends. Erosion and deposition can also be regional; erosion can occur due to dam removal and base level fall. Deposition can occur due to dam emplacement that causes the river to pool and deposit its entire load, or due to base level rise.

== Shores and shallow seas ==
Seas, oceans, and lakes accumulate sediment over time. The sediment can consist of terrigenous material, which originates on land, but may be deposited in either terrestrial, marine, or lacustrine (lake) environments, or of sediments (often biological) originating in the body of water. Terrigenous material is often supplied by nearby rivers and streams or reworked marine sediment (e.g. sand). In the mid-ocean, the exoskeletons of dead organisms are primarily responsible for sediment accumulation.

Deposited sediments are the source of sedimentary rocks, which can contain fossils of the inhabitants of the body of water that were, upon death, covered by accumulating sediment. Lake bed sediments that have not solidified into rock can be used to determine past climatic conditions.

=== Key marine depositional environments ===
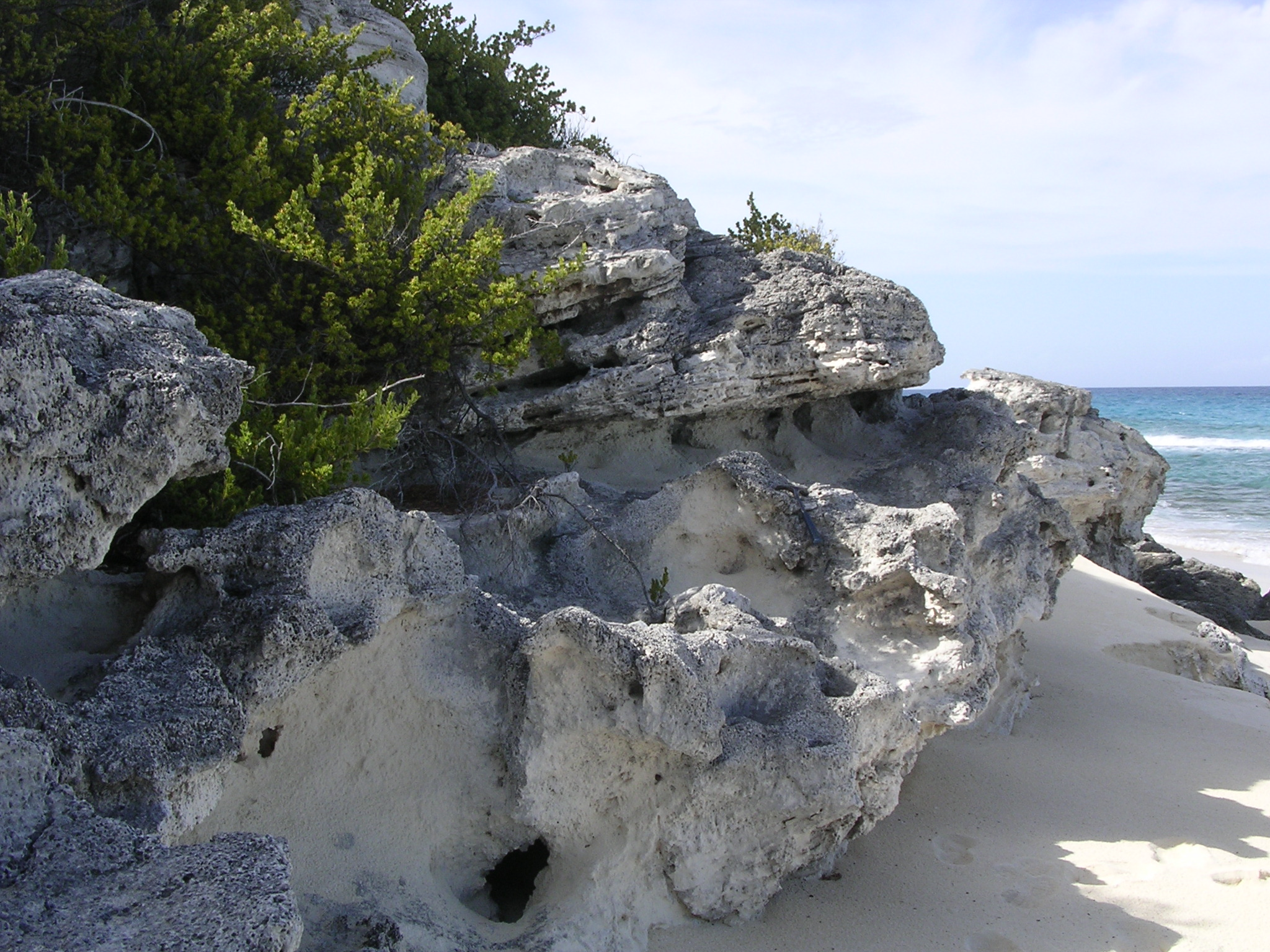
Holocene eolianite and a carbonate beach on Long Island, Bahamas

The major areas for deposition of sediments in the marine environment include:

- Littoral sands (e.g. beach sands, runoff river sands, coastal bars and spits, largely clastic with little faunal content)
- The continental shelf (silty clays, increasing marine faunal content).
- The shelf margin (low terrigenous supply, mostly calcareous faunal skeletons)
- The shelf slope (much more fine-grained silts and clays)
- Beds of estuaries with the resultant deposits called "bay mud".

One other depositional environment which is a mixture of fluvial and marine is the turbidite system, which is a major source of sediment to the deep sedimentary and abyssal basins as well as the deep oceanic trenches.

Any depression in a marine environment where sediments accumulate over time is known as a sediment trap.

The null point theory explains how sediment deposition undergoes a hydrodynamic sorting process within the marine environment leading to a seaward fining of sediment grain size.

== Environmental issues ==
=== Erosion and agricultural sediment delivery to rivers ===
One cause of high sediment loads is slash and burn and shifting cultivation of tropical forests. When the ground surface is stripped of vegetation and then seared of all living organisms, the upper soils are vulnerable to both wind and water erosion. In a number of regions of the earth, entire sectors of a country have become erodible. For example, on the Madagascar high central plateau, which constitutes approximately ten percent of that country's land area, most of the land area is devegetated, and gullies have eroded into the underlying soil to form distinctive gulleys called lavakas. These are typically 40 meters (130 ft) wide, 80 meters (260 ft) long and 15 meters (49 ft) deep. Some areas have as many as 150 lavakas/square kilometer, and lavakas may account for 84% of all sediments carried off by rivers. This siltation results in discoloration of rivers to a dark red brown color and leads to fish kills. In addition, sedimentation of river basins implies sediment management and siltation costs. The cost of removing an estimated 135 million m^{3} of accumulated sediments due to water erosion only is likely exceeding 2.3 billion euro (€) annually in the EU and UK, with large regional differences between countries.

Erosion is also an issue in areas of modern farming, where the removal of native vegetation for the cultivation and harvesting of a single type of crop has left the soil unsupported. Many of these regions are near rivers and drainages. Loss of soil due to erosion removes useful farmland, adds to sediment loads, and can help transport anthropogenic fertilizers into the river system, which leads to eutrophication.

The Sediment Delivery Ratio (SDR) is fraction of gross erosion (interill, rill, gully and stream erosion) that is expected to be delivered to the outlet of the river. The sediment transfer and deposition can be modelled with sediment distribution models such as WaTEM/SEDEM. In Europe, according to WaTEM/SEDEM model estimates the Sediment Delivery Ratio is about 15%.

=== Coastal development and sedimentation near coral reefs ===
Watershed development near coral reefs is a primary cause of sediment-related coral stress. The stripping of natural vegetation in the watershed for development exposes soil to increased wind and rainfall and, as a result, can cause exposed sediment to become more susceptible to erosion and delivery to the marine environment during rainfall events. Sediment can negatively affect corals in many ways, such as by physically smothering them, abrading their surfaces, causing corals to expend energy during sediment removal, and causing algal blooms that can ultimately lead to less space on the seafloor where juvenile corals (polyps) can settle.

When sediments are introduced into the coastal regions of the ocean, the proportion of land, marine, and organic-derived sediment that characterizes the seafloor near sources of sediment output is altered. In addition, because the source of sediment (i.e., land, ocean, or organically) is often correlated with how coarse or fine sediment grain sizes that characterize an area are on average, grain size distribution of sediment will shift according to the relative input of land (typically fine), marine (typically coarse), and organically-derived (variable with age) sediment. These alterations in marine sediment characterize the amount of sediment suspended in the water column at any given time and sediment-related coral stress.

=== Biological considerations ===
In July 2020, marine biologists reported that aerobic microorganisms (mainly), in "quasi-suspended animation", were found in organically-poor sediments, up to 101.5 million years old, 250 feet below the seafloor in the South Pacific Gyre (SPG) ("the deadest spot in the ocean"), and could be the longest-living life forms ever found.

== See also ==
- Bar (river morphology) – Elevated region of sediment in a river that has been deposited by the flow
- Beach cusps – Shoreline formations made up of various grades of sediment in an arc pattern
- Biorhexistasy – Soil formation theory
- Bioswale – Landscape elements designed to manage surface runoff water
- Decantation – Process for the separation of mixtures
- Deposition (geology) – Natural addition of materials to a landmass
- Depositional environment – Processes associated with the deposition of a particular type of sediment
- Erosion – Natural processes removing soil and rock
- Exner equation – Law of sediment aggradation
- Grain size, also known as particle size – Diameter of individual grains of sediment, or of lithified particles in clastic rocks
- Rain dust, also known as sediment precipitation – Form of precipitation containing visible dust
- Regolith – Layer of loose, superficial deposits covering solid rock
- Sand – Granular material composed of finely divided rock and mineral particles
- Sedimentology – Study of natural sediments and their formation processes
- Sediment trap – Any topographic depression where sediments substantially accumulate over time
- Settling – Process by which particulates move towards the bottom of a liquid and form a sediment
- Surface runoff – Flow of excess rainwater not infiltrating in the ground over its surface
