= Linden Yard =

Coordinates: 40.6393°N 74.2290°W

Linden Yard is the name of two separate railroad freight yards in Linden, New Jersey, United States. One is owned by the Staten Island Railway (SIR) and the other is managed by Conrail Shared Assets Operations along the Northeast Corridor (NEC) right of way.

== Staten Island Railway ==
The Staten Island Railway operates a 19-track freight yard. It lies west of the Chemical Coast in Elizabeth and east of the combined NEC and North Jersey Coast Lines in Linden. The SIR line's grade separated flyover of the NEC is located just north of the Linden station. It is also situated between U.S. Route 1/9 and Interstate 95, just south of Interstate 278 and north of ConocoPhillips' Linden Terminal facility which is part of its Bayway Refinery complex.

ExpressRail traffic from Howland Hook Marine Terminal and the containers from the Staten Island Transfer Station at the site of the former Fresh Kills Landfill on Staten Island may pass through Linden Yard. Chemical traffic from the Chemical Coast line may also use Linden Yard before heading west to either the Raritan Valley Line or the Conrail Lehigh Line.

The SIR Line from Cranford to Staten Island over the Arthur Kill Bridge was originally constructed by the Baltimore & Ohio Railroad from 1889 to 1890.

== Northeast Corridor ==
The Conrail Linden Yard is a 16-track freight yard located between West Linden Avenue and the Northeast Corridor Line. This is south of the SIR yard and completely separate from it. The Conrail yard is located northwest of the Linden Airport and also northwest of the brownfield site where a General Motors (GM) plant used to be located (the GM Linden Assembly plant closed in 2005 and was demolished in 2008).

== See also ==
- Arlington Yard
- List of New Jersey railroad junctions
- Staten Island Railway
