= Arlington Yard =

Freight rail yard on Staten Island, New York City

Coordinates: 40.6333°N 74.1745°W

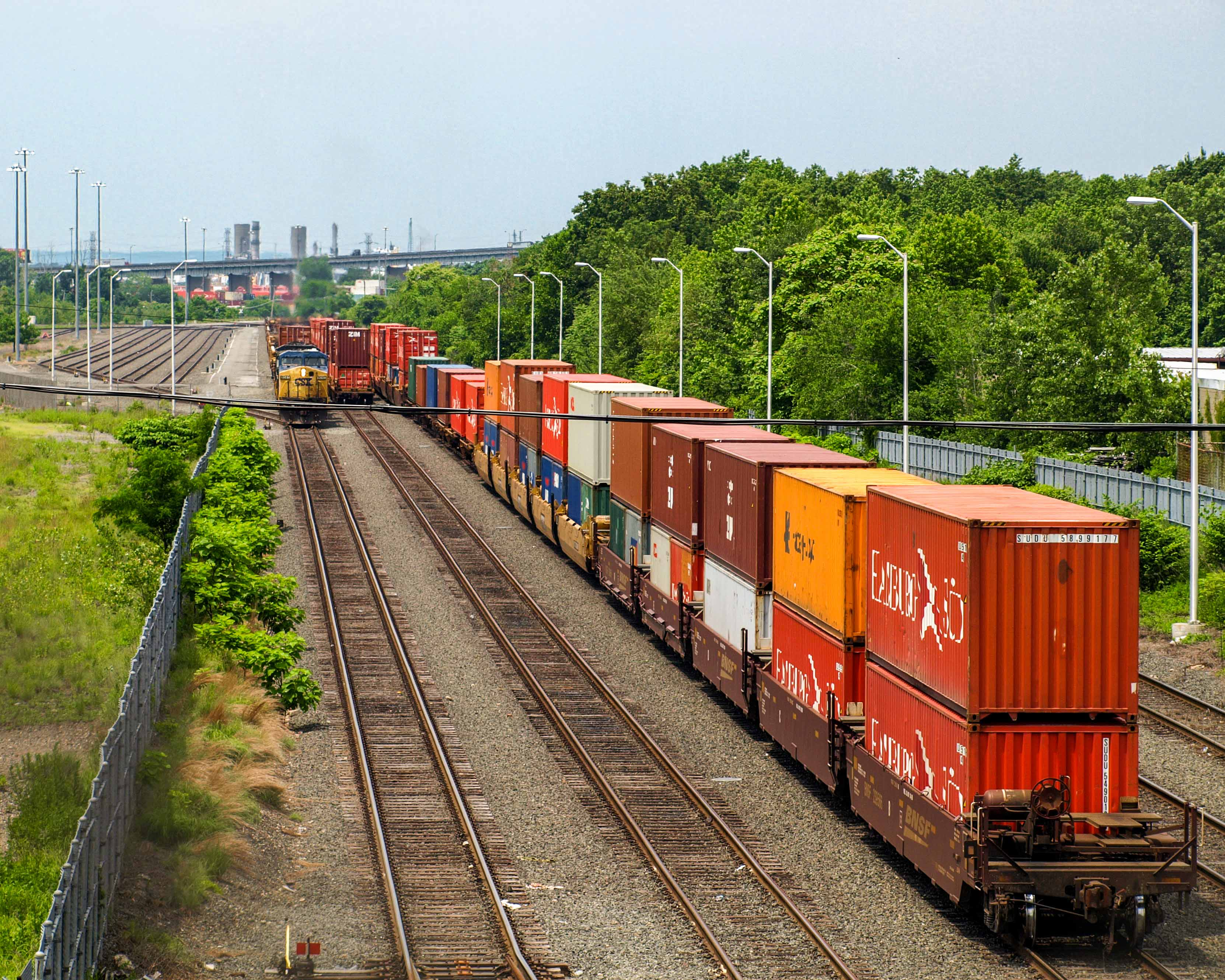
Double stack container train at Arlington Yard

Arlington Yard is a freight yard located on the North Shore Branch right of way of the Staten Island Railway in Staten Island, New York, United States. It lies west of the former Arlington station, east of Western Avenue, and north of the Staten Island Expressway in the Port Ivory neighborhood. The yard leads into the Travis Branch of the railway, the Howland Hook Container Terminal, and the Arthur Kill Lift Bridge to Elizabeth, New Jersey and the Chemical Coast and is part of the ExpressRail network.

The 2007 opening of the Staten Island Transfer Station and the ExpressRail facility, along with the reopening of the Arthur Kill bridge, has reactivated the yard. The use of the Howland Hook Container Terminal to transfer containerized municipal waste from barges to trains, servicing roughly half of New York City's barged trash volume, has added to the rail traffic handled by the yard. (The facility that handles the other half is located directly across Arthur Kill.)

== History ==
The yard opened in 1886. The name of the neighborhood Arlington was coined after the Baltimore and Ohio Railroad (B&O) purchased a farm at Old Place, on Staten Island's northwestern corner, which would become the Arlington freight yard. The B&O renamed the area Arlington. Following the completion of the Arthur Kill Bridge in 1889, the yard was the first stop for freight trains coming from New Jersey. Arlington Yards was the hub of Staten Island's freight industry for most of the 20th century. The engine house at Arlington was a small, two stall, cinder-block building. There was a tank car to fuel locomotives in the yard. Materials used to perform minor repairs to freight cars could be found inside the building. At one point the yard had a capacity for 3,000 train cars.

== See also ==
- Howland Hook Marine Terminal
- ExpressRail Staten Island
- Port Ivory, Staten Island
- Linden Yard
- List of railroad yards in New York City
