= Red Hook Container Terminal =

Freight transport facility in New York City

Coordinates: 40°41′15″N 74°0′12″W

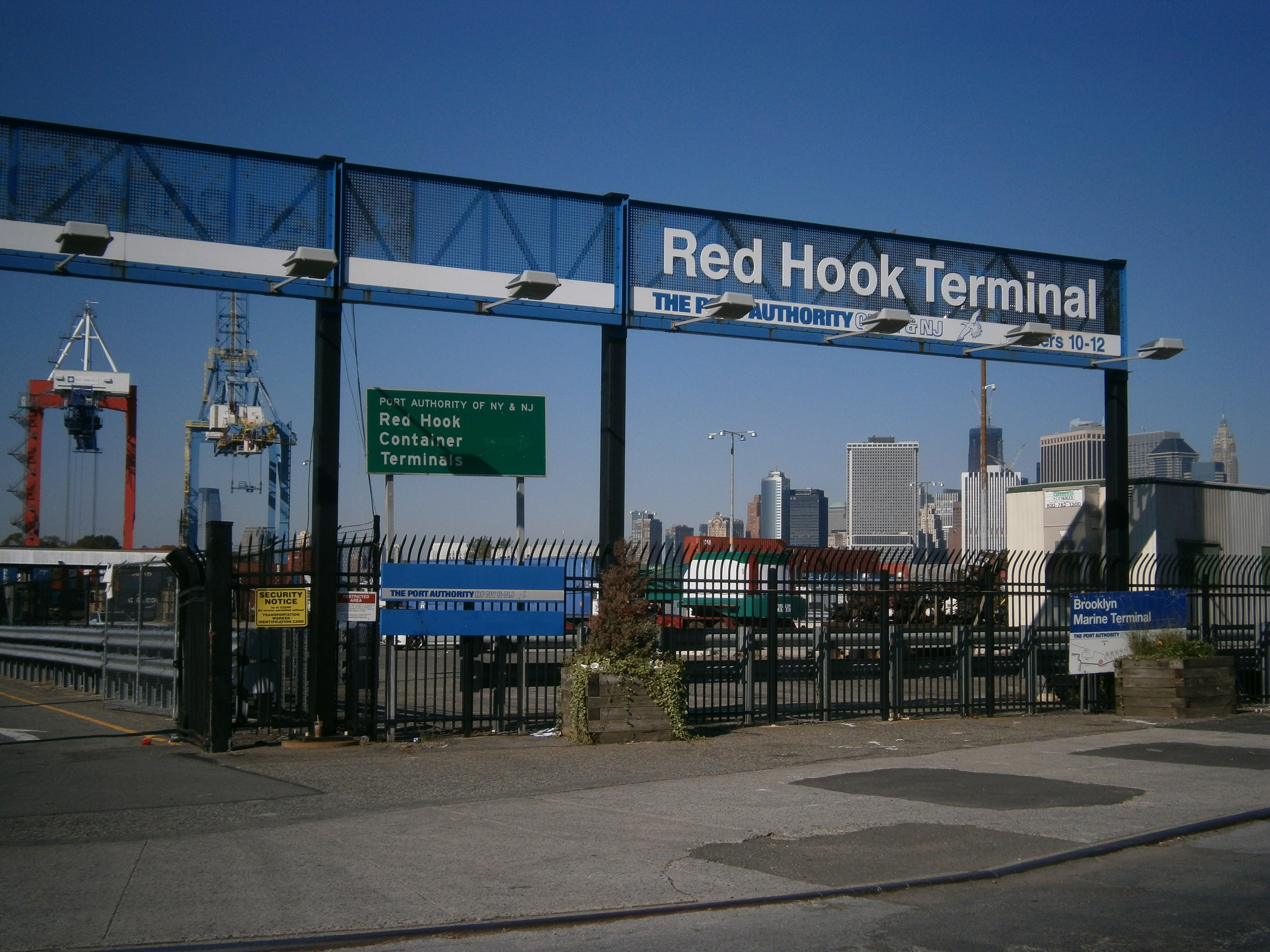

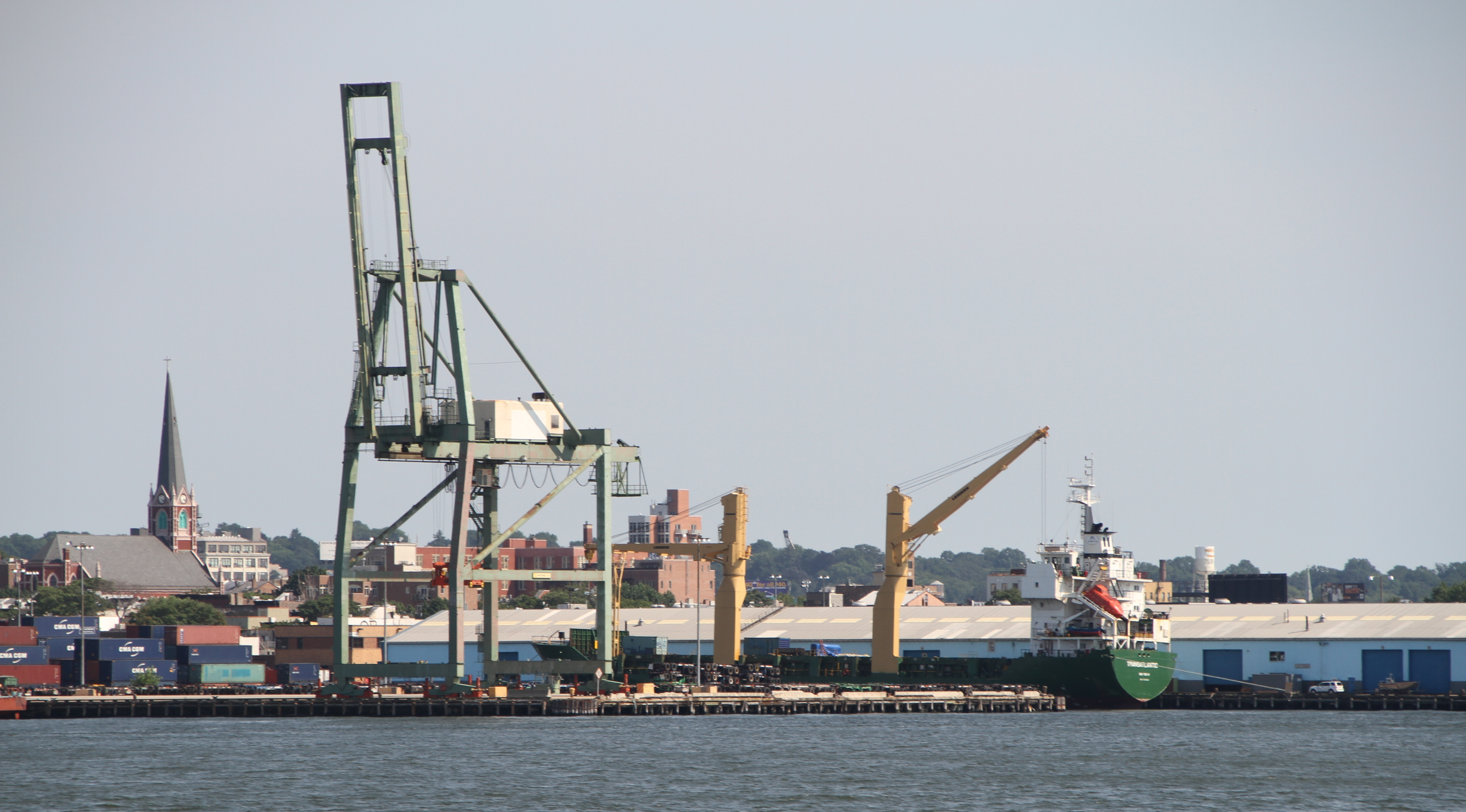

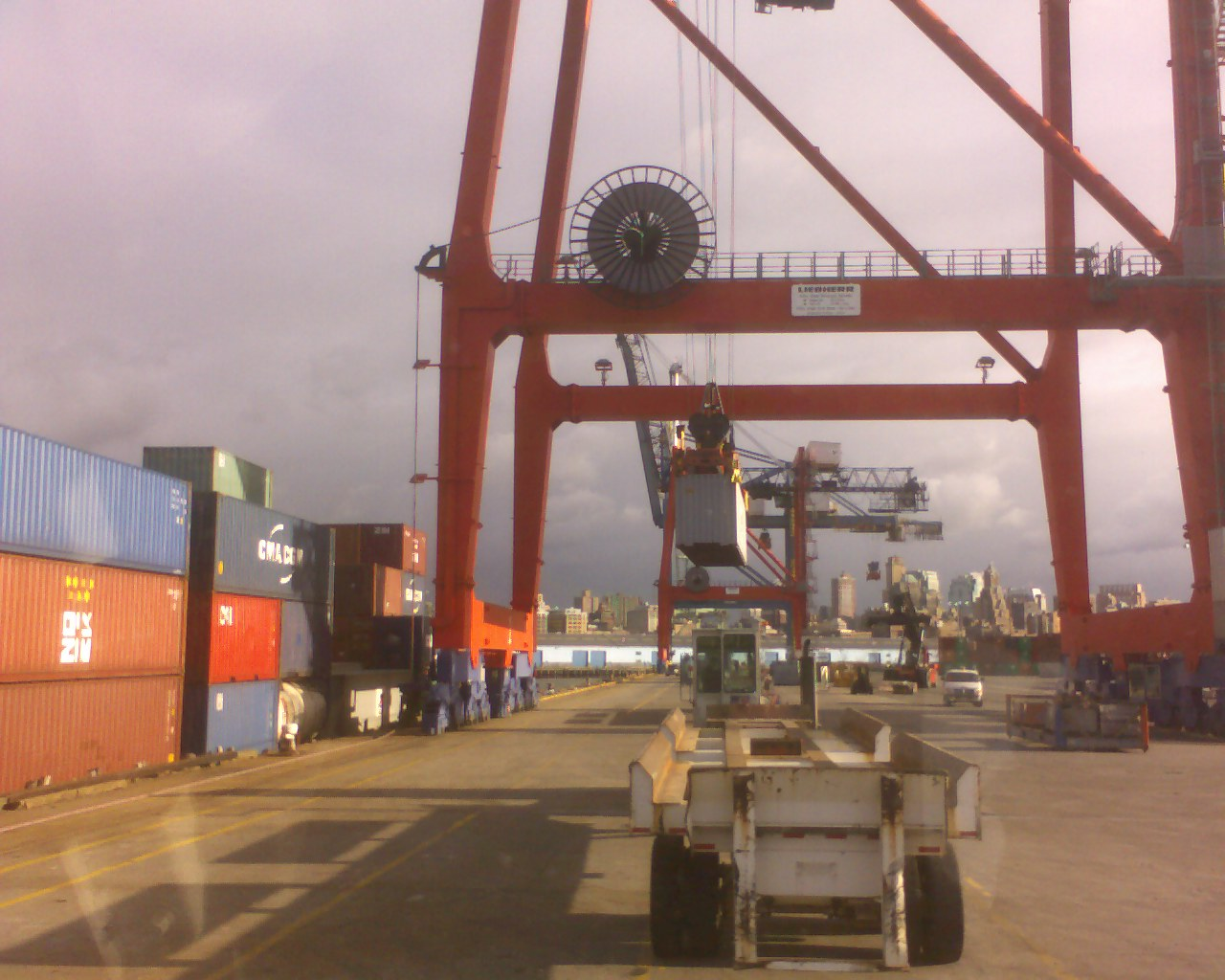
View of containers and cranes at terminal

The Red Hook Marine Terminal is an intermodal freight transport facility in the Red Hook neighborhood of Brooklyn in New York City, on the Upper New York Bay in the Port of New York and New Jersey. The maritime facility handles container ships and bulk cargo and includes a container terminal. The Port Authority of New York and New Jersey (PANYNJ) bought the piers in the 1950s when there was still much break bulk cargo activity in the port. The container terminal was built in the 1980s. Nearly all labor on the terminal is supplied by Local 1814 of the International Longshoreman's Association union.

There are two active container cranes along 2,080 feet berth, 3,140 feet of breakbulk berth space, two major bulk-handling yards, and approximately 400,000 square feet of warehouse. In October 2011 the PANYNJ took over operations at the site. In 2011, the terminal handled 110,000 containers. Red Hook Container Terminal LLC operates the terminal in an agreement made in 2011 with the Port Authority when it had control over the facility. In May 2024, the Port Authority transferred ownership of the terminal to the New York City government.

== See also ==
- Brooklyn Cruise Terminal
- Howland Hook Marine Terminal
- Port Jersey Marine Terminal
- Port Newark-Elizabeth Marine Terminal
- South Brooklyn Marine Terminal
- Geography of New York-New Jersey Harbor Estuary
