= Port Ivory, Staten Island =

Neighborhood in New York City

Coordinates: 40.640°N 74.179°W

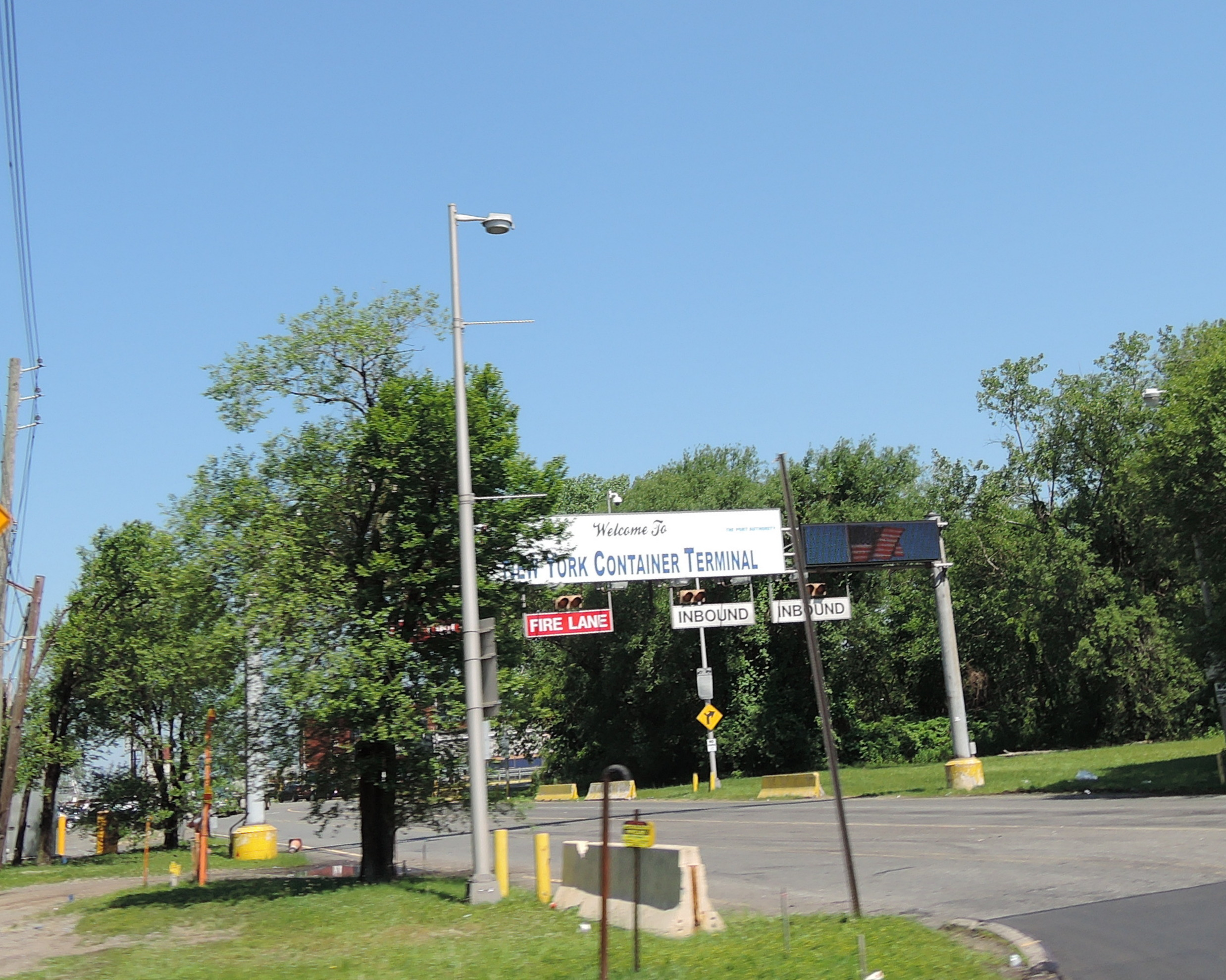
New York Container Terminal entrance

Port Ivory is a coastal area in the northwestern corner of Staten Island, New York City, New York, United States. It is located on Newark Bay near the entrances the Kill van Kull in the east and Arthur Kill in the west. It is bordered by Arlington to the east, Old Place to the south, Newark Bay to the north, and the Arthur Kill to the west.

The area bore the name of Milliken originally, and became locally known as Port Ivory after Ivory Soap, one of the best-known products from Procter & Gamble, which operated a factory at the site from 1907 until 1991, when the soap making operation was moved to Mexico. Located nearby is the Howland Hook Marine Terminal. The Port Authority of New York and New Jersey which leases the Howland Hook facility is contracting out the construction of an intermodal rail yard using part of the former Ivory Soap factory site to help with ship to rail transshipment.

Another transportation resource is the North Shore branch of the Staten Island Railway, which crosses the Arthur Kill on its own Arthur Kill Vertical Lift Bridge, adjacent and parallel to the Goethals Bridge, and eventually reaches Cranford Junction, New Jersey. However, passenger trains stopped serving the Port Ivory (formerly Milliken) station several years before passenger service on the branch as a whole ceased in 1953, and freight activity on the line became rare by the 1970s and nonexistent by the beginning of the 1990s. Efforts to restore the freight service by the New York City Economic Development Corporation were completed in June 2006. The Arlington Yard re-build connected to the new ExpressRail terminal at the marine terminal.

The Staten Island Expressway is sometimes cited as Port Ivory's southern boundary. The island's (and New York City's) lone mobile home park is on Goethals Road North, a service road of the expressway; the only other residents of the heavily industrial neighborhood live in a few older single-family homes a short distance to the east, along Forest Avenue.

== Demographics ==
For census purposes, the New York City Department of City Planning classifies Port Ivory as part of a larger Neighborhood Tabulation Area called Mariner's Harbor-Arlington-Graniteville SI0107. This designated neighborhood had 33,492 inhabitants based on data from the 2020 United States Census. This was an increase of 2,018 persons (6.4%) from the 31,474 counted in 2010. The neighborhood had a population density of 35.2 inhabitants per acre (14,500/sq mi; 5,600/km^{2}).

The racial makeup of the neighborhood was 19.8% (6,618) White (Non-Hispanic), 29.4% (9,853) Black (Non-Hispanic), 10.9% (3,659) Asian, and 4.4% (1,452) from two or more races. Hispanic or Latino of any race were 35.6% (11,910) of the population.

According to the 2020 United States Census, this area has many cultural communities of over 1,000 inhabitants. This include residents who identify as Mexican, Puerto Rican, Dominican, Irish, Italian, Chinese, and African-American.

The largest age group was people 5-19 years old, which made up 22.2% of the residents. 74.5% of the households had at least one family present. Out of the 10,640 households, 40.9% had a married couple (18.1% with a child under 18), 5.7% had a cohabiting couple (2.9% with a child under 18), 17.9% had a single male (2.1% with a child under 18), and 35.5% had a single female (10.9% with a child under 18). 41.4% of households had children under 18. In this neighborhood, 70.2% of non-vacant housing units are renter-occupied.
