= Port Newark–Elizabeth Marine Terminal =

Major component of the Port of New York and New Jersey

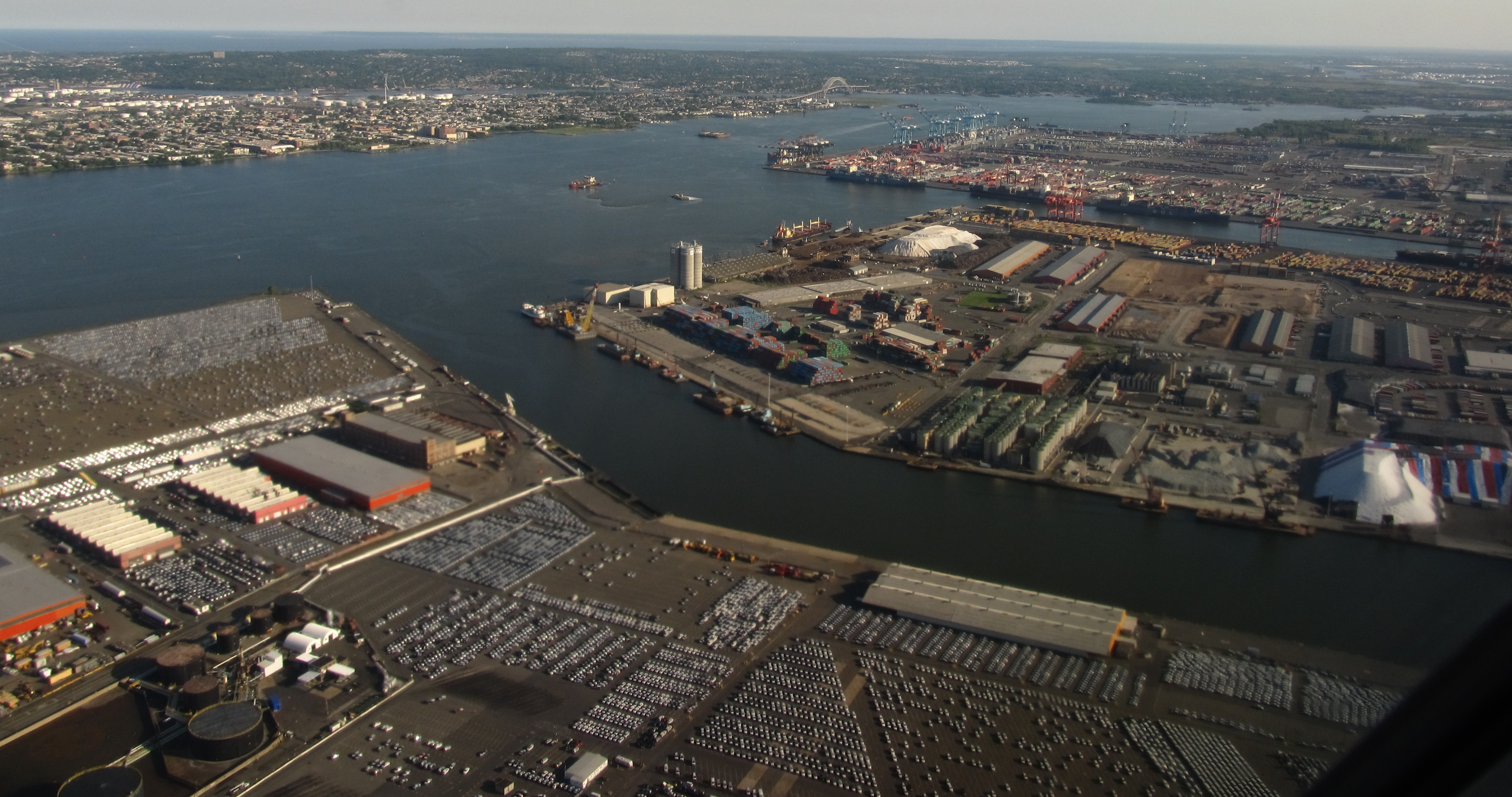
- Port Newark–Elizabeth Marine Terminal in New Jersey
- Interactive map of Port Newark–Elizabeth Marine Terminal

Location
- Coordinates: 40°40′54″N 74°09′02″W

Details
- Draft depth: 50 feet (15 m)
- Air draft: 215 feet (66 m) (Bayonne Bridge)

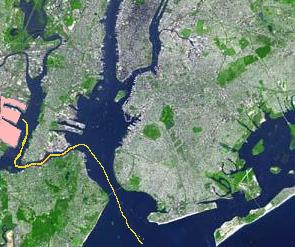
The port facility in pink along with the usual route of ships entering Newark Bay via The Narrows and Kill Van Kull between Bayonne, New Jersey, and Staten Island

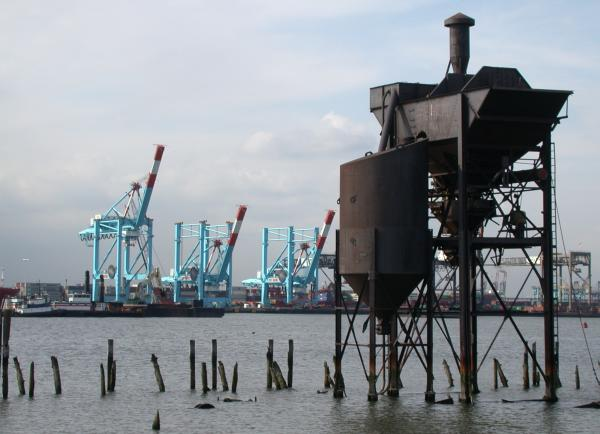
Container port facilities at Port Newark–Elizabeth Marine Terminal seen from Bayonne, New Jersey

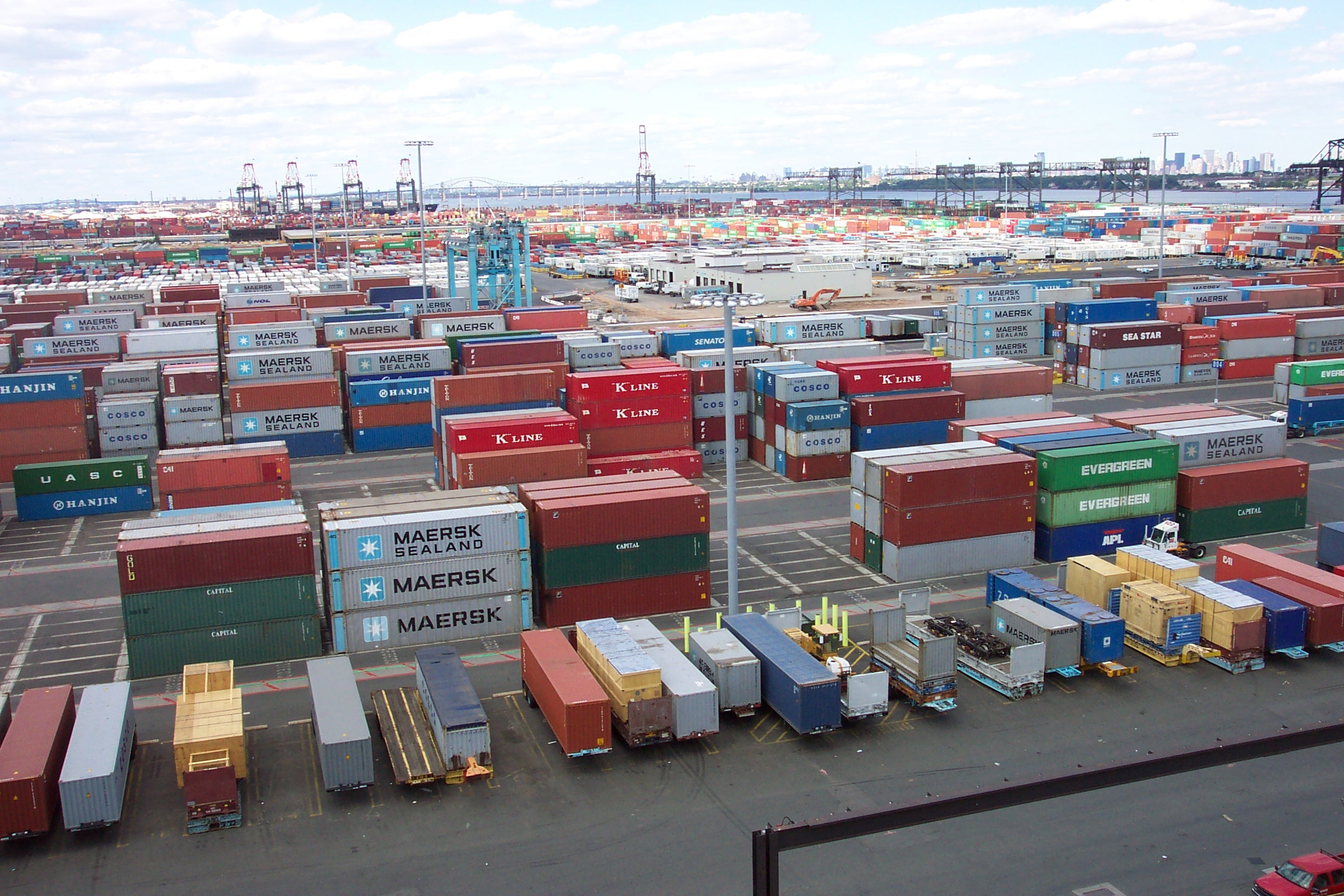
Part of the A.P. Moller Container terminal at Port Elizabeth

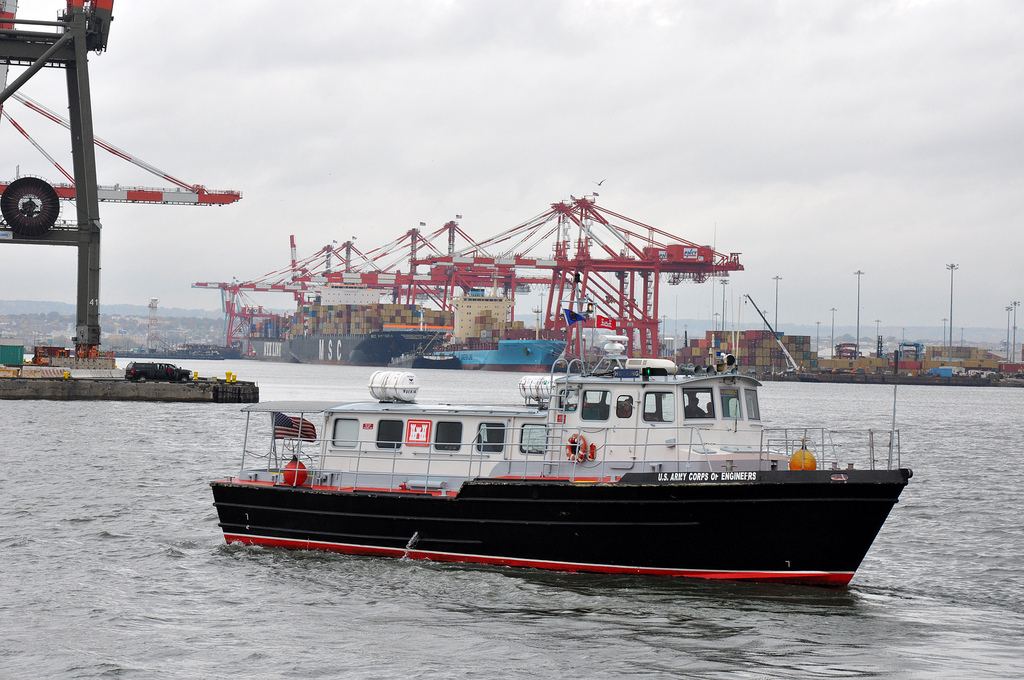
USACE patrol boat on Newark Bay

Port Newark–Elizabeth Marine Terminal, a major component of the Port of New York and New Jersey, is the principal container ship facility for goods entering and leaving the New York metropolitan area and the northeastern quadrant of North America.

Located on Newark Bay, the facility is run by the Port Authority of New York and New Jersey. Its two components, Port Newark and the Elizabeth Marine Terminal (sometimes called Port Elizabeth) sit side by side within the cities of Newark and Elizabeth, New Jersey, just east of the New Jersey Turnpike and Newark Liberty International Airport.

== Operations ==
As of 2004, the facility was the largest on the U.S. East Coast and the second-largest in the country.

Container goods typically arrive on container ships through The Narrows and the Kill Van Kull before entering Newark Bay, a shallow body of water that has been dredged to accommodate large ships. Some ships enter Newark Bay via the Arthur Kill. The port facility consists of two main dredged slips and multiple loading cranes. Shipping containers are arrayed in large stacks visible from the New Jersey Turnpike before being loaded onto rail cars and trucks.

Since 1998, the port has seen a 65% increase in traffic. In 2006, it handled more than 20% of all US imports from Germany, more than any other US port.

In 2009, the major port operators at Port Newark–Elizabeth included Maher Terminals, APM Terminals (part of A. P. Moller-Maersk), and Port Newark Container Terminal (owned by Ports America Inc.).

=== Improvements ===
The port received new cranes in May 2014.

The height of ships serving the port is limited by the Bayonne Bridge over Kill Van Kull. This limitation grew more serious with the Panama Canal's 2016 expansion that enabled bigger, New Panamax ships to reach the port from Asia. In 2012, the Port Authority announced plans to raise the Bayonne Bridge's roadway to 215 feet (66 m) over the water, at a cost of around $1.7 billion. The increased navigational clearance was achieved in June 2017, and the overall bridge project was completed in 2019. Other improvements are expected to cost additional billions of dollars, including larger cranes, bigger railyard facilities, deeper channels, and expanded wharves.

== Rail facilities ==
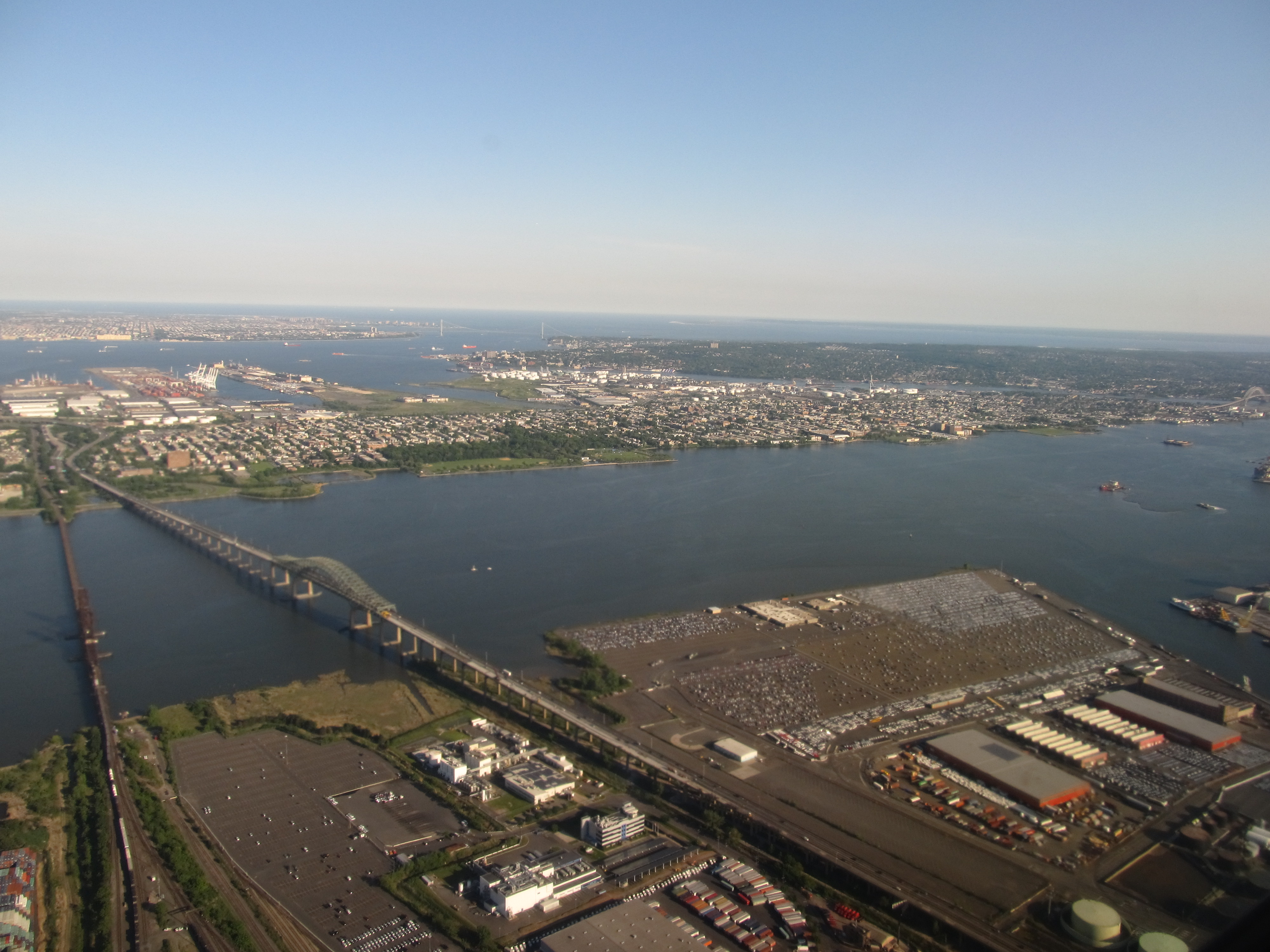
Port Newark and the adjacent Doremus Ave. Auto Terminal auto processing facilities

ExpressRail, an initiative of the PANYNJ, provides dockside transloading operations at both Port Elizabeth (operated by Millennium Marine Rail) and Port Newark. Conrail Shared Assets Operations (CRCX) is the terminal railroad connecting to the Chemical Coast for CSX Transportation (CSX) and Norfolk Southern (NS).

The auto-processing facilities at the north end of Port Newark and the adjacent Doremus Ave. Auto Terminal are served by dockside trackage. Oak Island Yard, the major classification yard in the region, is just north of the port. NS operates an ExpressRail yard south of the port next to Jersey Gardens.

== History ==
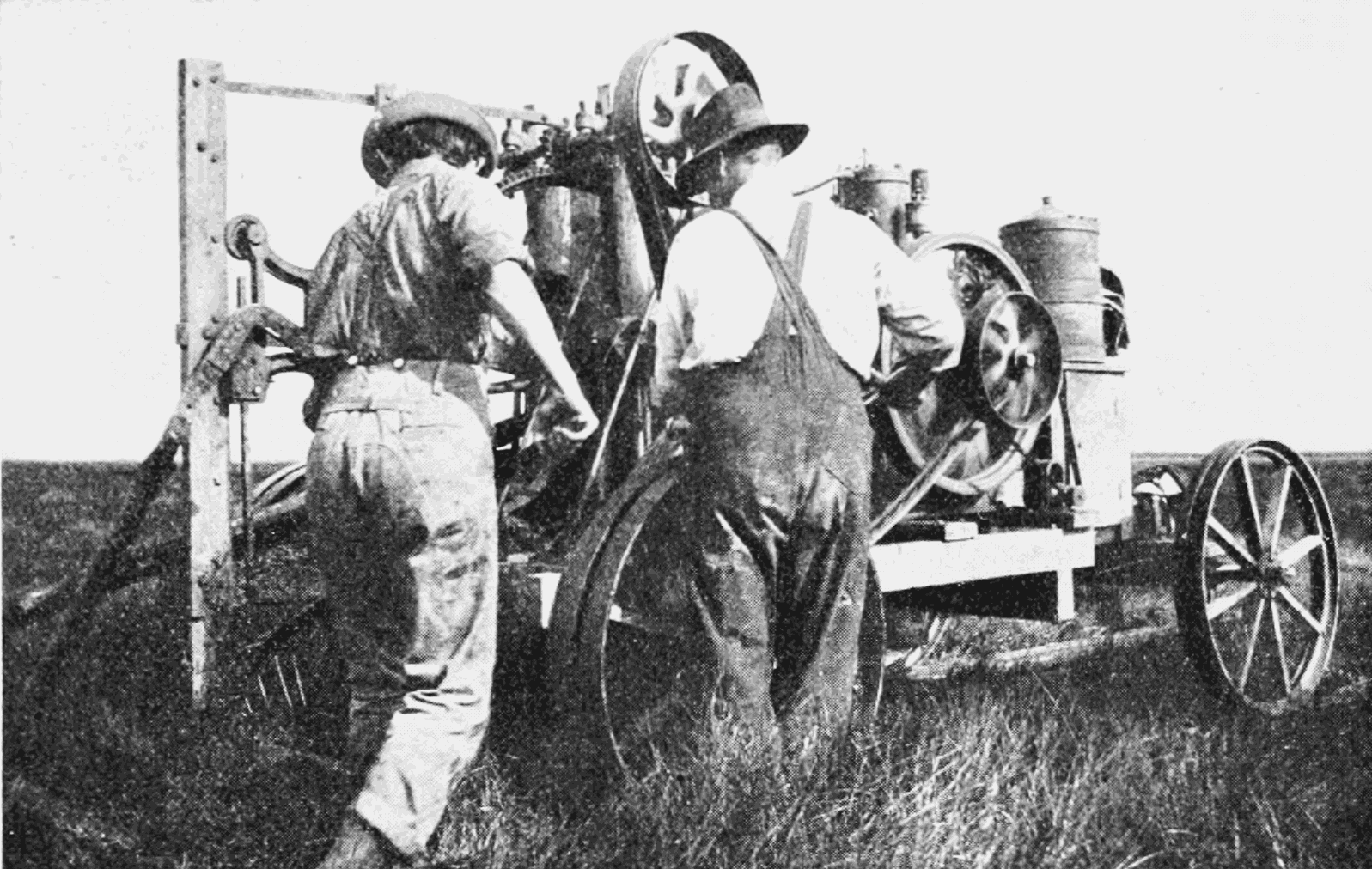
Early reclamation efforts

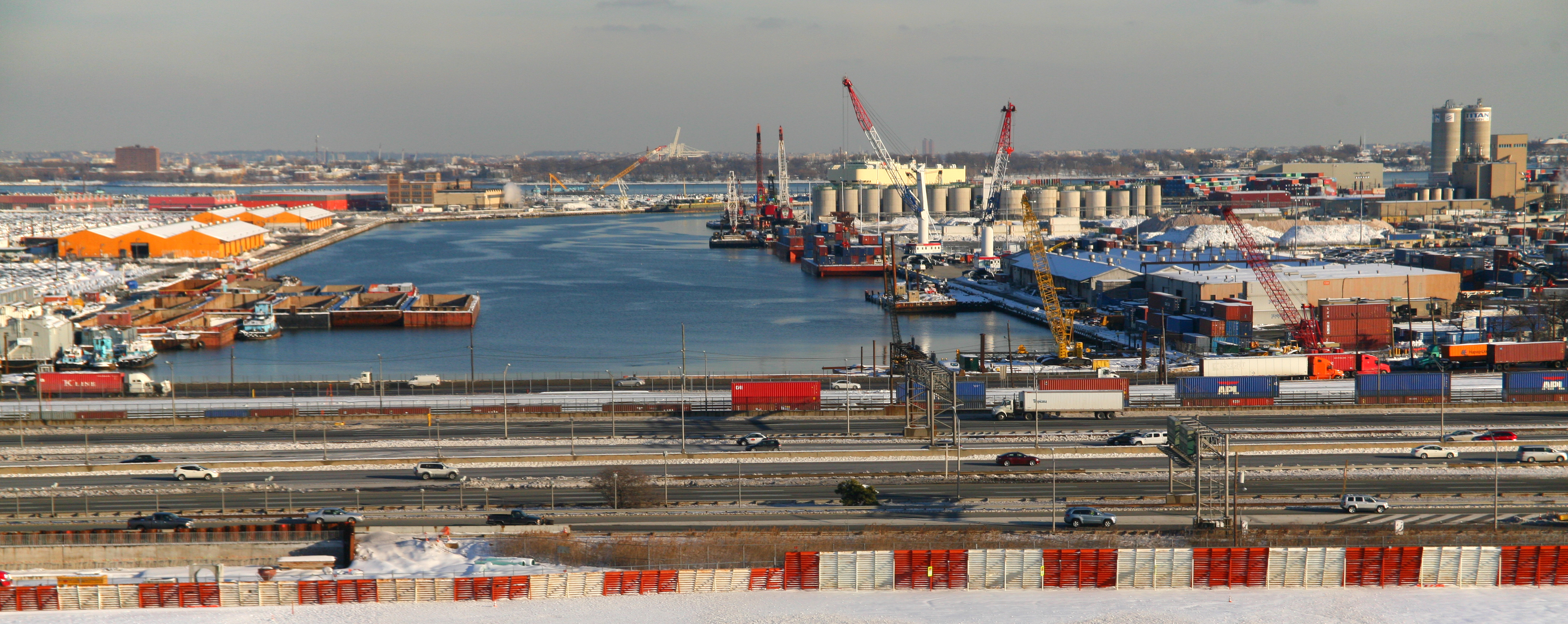
Port Newark

The western edge of Newark Bay was originally the Newark Meadows, shallow tidal wetlands covering about 12 square miles (31 km^{2}). In the 1910s, the city of Newark began excavating an angled shipping channel in the northeastern quadrant of the wetland. This became the basis of Port Newark. Work on the channel and terminal facilities on its north side accelerated during World War I, when the federal government took control of Port Newark. During the war, nearly 25,000 troops were stationed at the Newark Bay Shipyard.

The Port Authority of New York and New Jersey was formed in 1921, and the Newark Bay Channels were authorized by the Rivers and Harbors Acts in 1922. Shipping operations languished after the war, and in 1927, the city of Newark started construction of Newark Airport (now known as Newark Liberty International Airport) on the northwestern quadrant of the wetlands that lay between Port Newark and the edge of the developed city. The port authority took over the operations of Port Newark and Newark Airport in 1948 and began modernizing both facilities and expanding them southward.

The SS Ideal X, considered the first container ship, made her maiden voyage as a container carrier on April 26, 1956, carrying 58 containers from Port Newark to the Port of Houston. SeaLand expanded its operations into the newly developed container terminal.

In 1958, the port authority dredged another shipping channel, which straightened the course of Bound Brook, the tidal inlet forming the boundary between Newark and Elizabeth. Dredged materials were used to create new upland south of the new Elizabeth Channel, where the port authority constructed the Elizabeth Marine Terminal. The first shipping facility to open on the Elizabeth Channel was the new 90-acre (36 ha) Sea-Land Container Terminal, which was the prototype for virtually every container terminal constructed thereafter.

This new port facility antiquated most of the traditional waterfront port facilities in New York Harbor, leading to a steep decline in such areas as Manhattan, Hoboken, Jersey City and Brooklyn. The automated nature of the facility requires far fewer workers and does not require the opening of containers before onward shipping.

In 2000, a Congressional study deemed the port and other transportation, communications, oil, and chemical facilities along a 2 miles (3.2 km) stretch of New Jersey "the nation's most enticing environment for terrorists", according to a 2005 New York Times article.

In 2011, PANYNJ restructured the lease of a major tenant, Port Newark Container Terminal (PNCT), whose owner had been subject of the Dubai Ports World controversy. The agreement calls for a 20-year extension of PNCT's existing lease through 2050, subject to PNCT's investment of $500 million and an expansion from 180 acres (73 ha) to about 287 acres (116 ha) to accommodate additional volume. It is expected to generate an annual increase in container volume from Mediterranean Shipping Company, the world's second-largest shipping company, from 414,000 to 1.1 million containers by 2030. Various planned steps to accommodate this growth include deepening the Kill van Kull, raising the Bayonne Bridge, and expanding rail freight facilities. Highstar Capital, the owner of PNCT's parent company Ports America is shopping the company. In 2017, a Turkish company seeks to buy Ports America.

In July 2023, an Italian-flagged ship owned by the Grimaldi Group carrying close to 1,200 vehicles for export caught fire, resulting in the death of two Newark Fire Department firefighters.

== Port of New York and New Jersey facilities ==
Other seaport terminals of the Port Authority of New York and New Jersey include:

- Howland Hook Marine Terminal on Arthur Kill at Newark Bay
- Port Jersey Marine Terminal on Upper New York Bay

== See also ==
- Gateway Region
- Chemical Coast
- List of North American ports
- List of ports in the United States
- List of world's busiest container ports
- Marine life of New York-New Jersey Harbor Estuary
