= John's Cove (New Jersey) =

Cove in Elizabeth, New Jersey, United States

Coordinates: 40.649577°N 74.177261°W

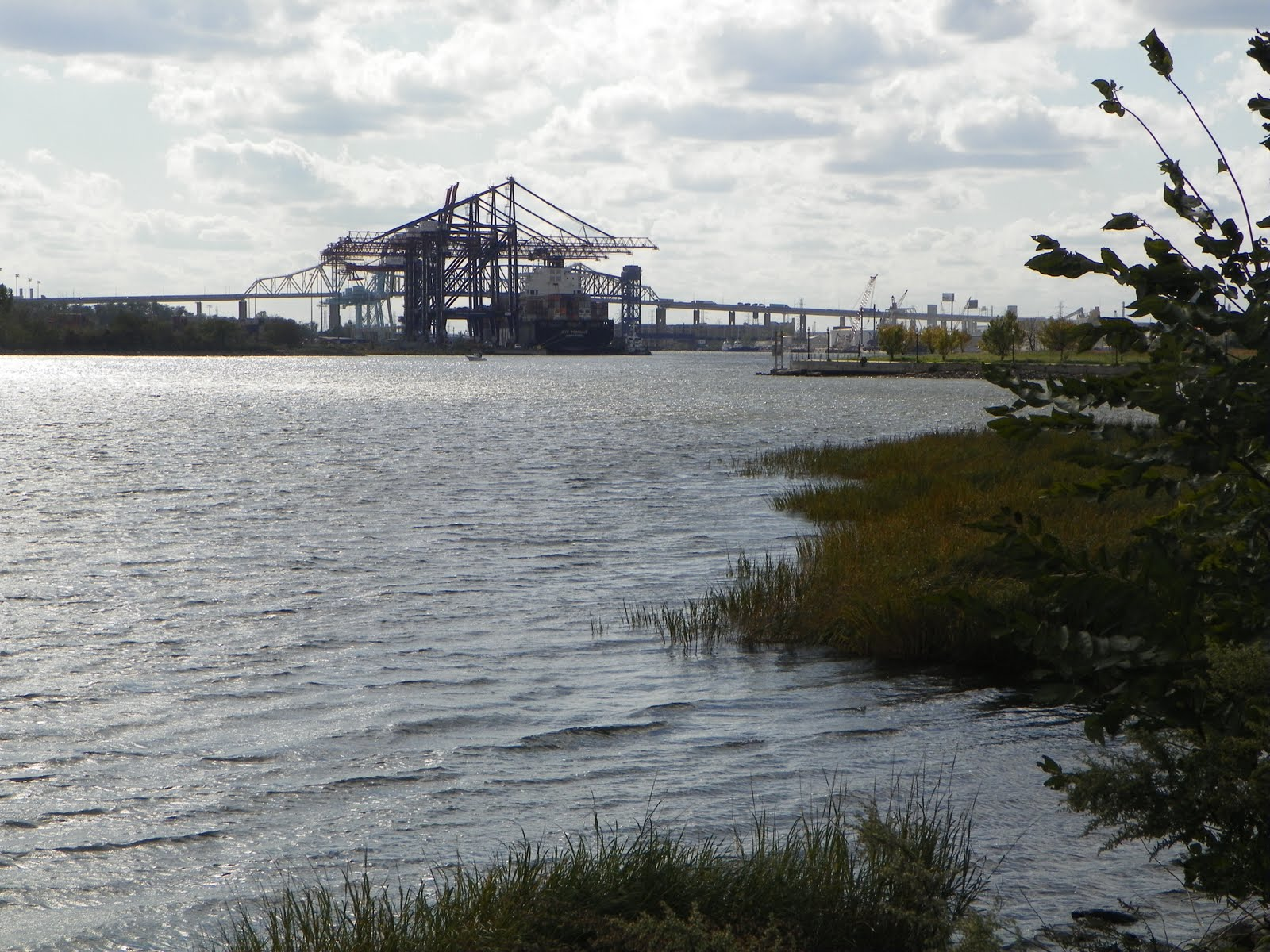
A picture taken from John's Cove facing Howland Hook and the Goethals Bridge

John's Cove is located on the Arthur Kill on the Elizabeth, New Jersey waterfront facing Howland Hook Marine Terminal in Staten Island, New York.

== Description ==
John's Cove is located at the northern end the Elizabeth Waterfront's Arthur Kill Blueway which runs from the Elizabeth River north to the Norfolk Southern railyard and Jersey Gardens shopping mall. It is within the Arthur Kill Federal Marine Highway.

The cove's marine life is exposed to dioxins, mercury and other toxins from industrial source point pollution. There is a New Jersey State Department of Environmental Protection fish/shellfish/blue claw crab warning on all fishing. Fisherpersons are encouraged to catch and release all fish and marine life.

In December 2021, John's Cove was designated as a "Living Shoreline - A Vital Avian, Marine and Animal Ecosystem" to highlight its importance and the city's commitment to its preservation.

== Naming ==
John's Cove was named after Dr. John Dobosiewicz by resolution from the Elizabeth City Council on September 10, 2013, shortly after his death. He was the executive director of the School of General Studies at Kean University and co-founder of the Elizabeth River/Arthur Kill Watershed Association. He was heavily involved in projects that took place on the Elizabeth waterfront.

== Gallery ==
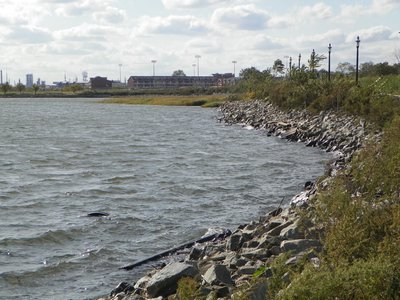

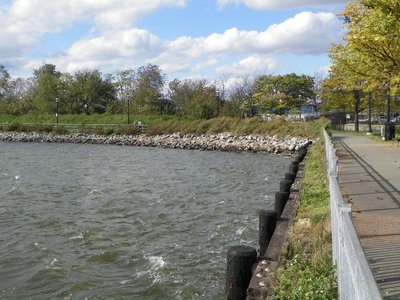

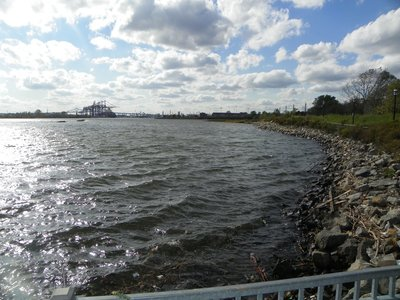

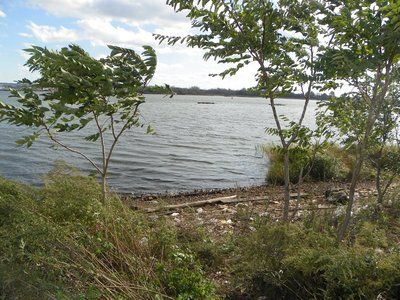

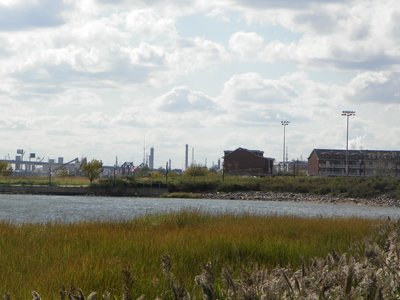

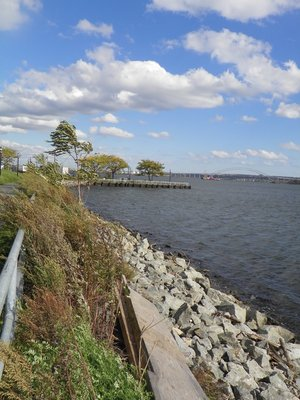

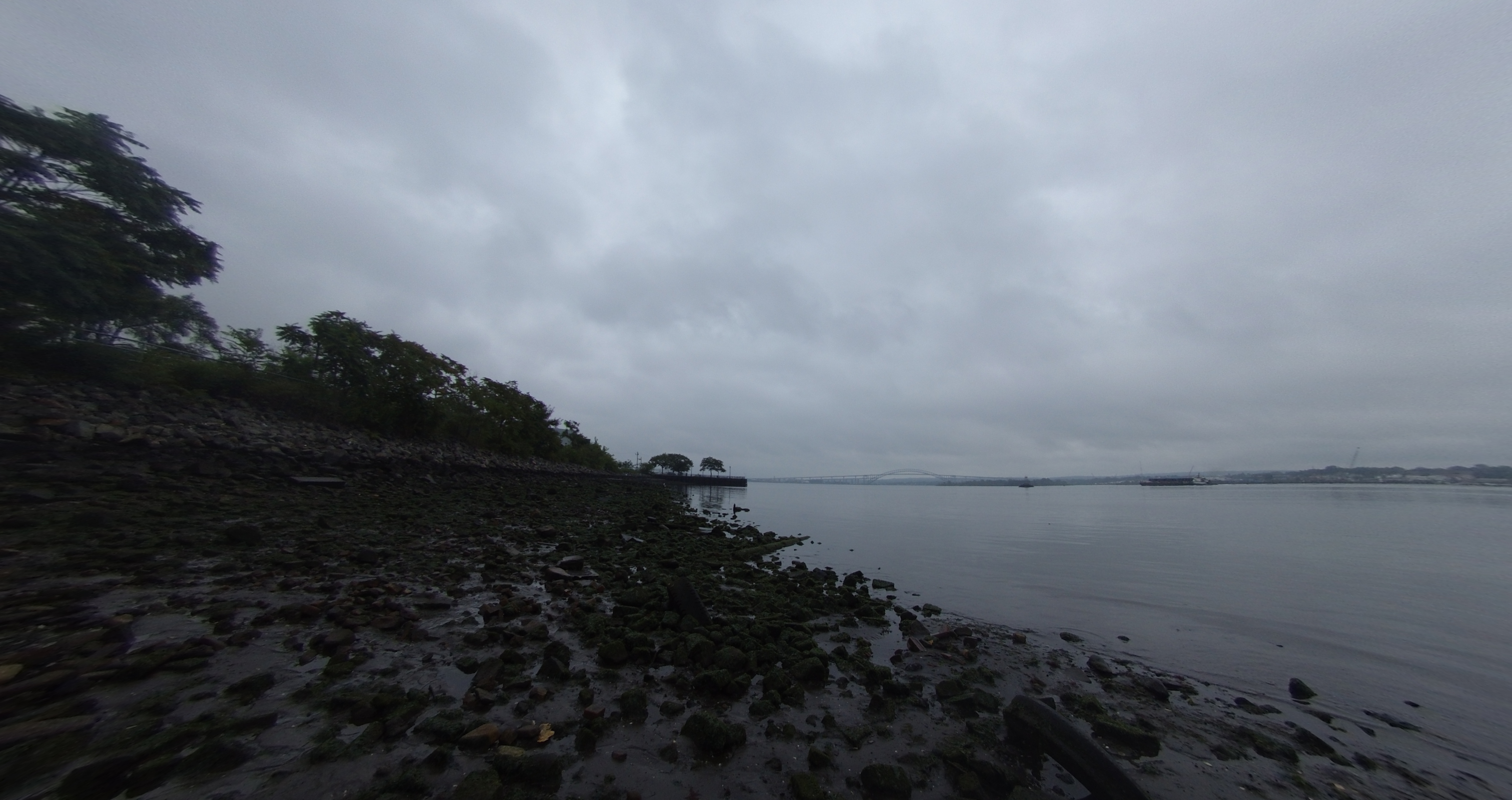

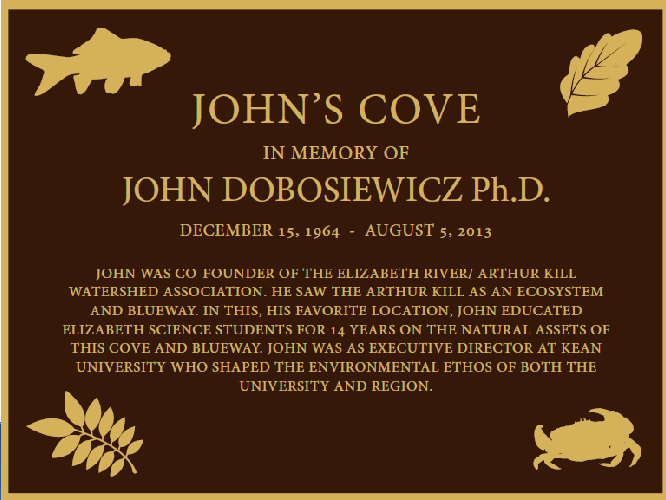

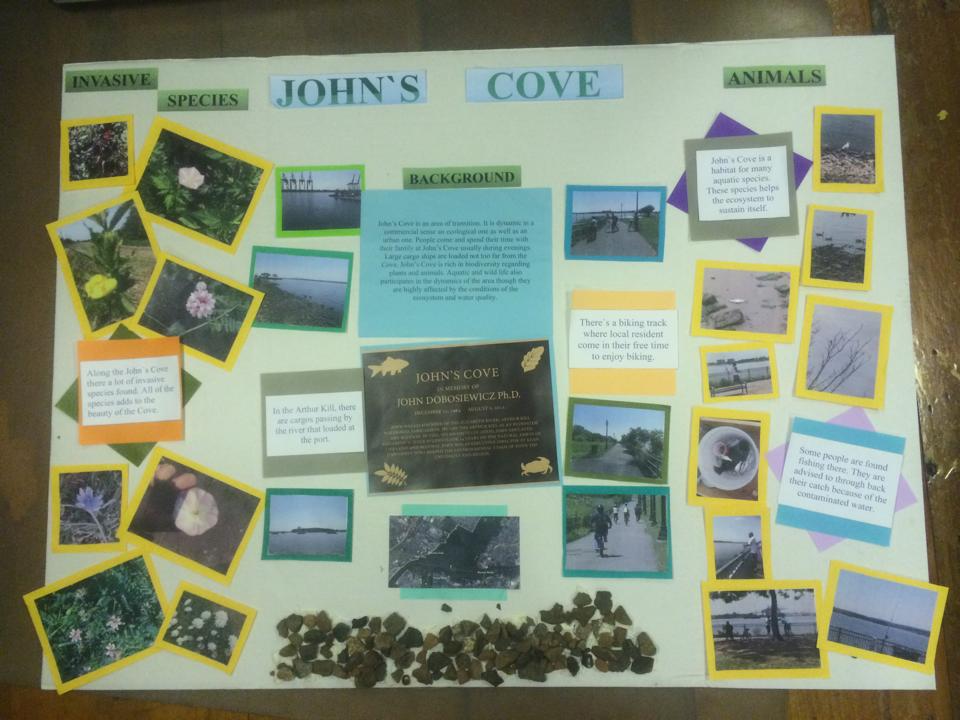

== See also ==
- Geography of New York-New Jersey Harbor Estuary
- Elizabeth River (New Jersey)
- Howland Hook
