= Arthur Kill Bridge =

Railroad bridge in New York, 1888–1959

- Coordinates: 40°38′15″N 74°11′44″W
- Carries: Baltimore and Ohio Railroad (B&O); Staten Island Railroad (SIR)
- Crosses: Arthur Kill
- Locale: Elizabeth, New Jersey and Staten Island, New York City, U.S.
- Owner: Baltimore and Ohio Railroad

Characteristics
- Design: Through truss swing
- Total length: 800 feet (240 m)
- Longest span: 500 feet (150 m)
- No. of spans: 3
- Clearance below: 32 feet (9.8 m)

History
- Designer: Charles Ackenheit
- Constructed by: Keystone Bridge Company
- Construction cost: $500,000
- Opened: January 1, 1890
- Closed: 1959

Location
- Interactive map of Arthur Kill Bridge

The Arthur Kill Bridge was a railroad bridge connecting Staten Island, New York to New Jersey's Chemical Coast by crossing the Arthur Kill. It existed from 1888 until 1959, when it was replaced by the current Arthur Kill Vertical Lift Bridge, built nearby. It was the only land connection to Staten Island until 1928.

== Proposal for a bridge ==
Although a temporary pontoon bridge to Elizabeth, New Jersey was built by the British during the Revolution, Staten Island was usually accessible only by ferry to New Jersey or by private boat. It was not until 1810 that regular ferry service was established to Manhattan.

As early as 1850, campaigns for a bridge to Bayonne, New Jersey were begun by some summer residents of the island, although opposed by many permanent residents. In 1870 the New York State Legislature passed a bill authorizing a swing-span bridge from New Brighton, Staten Island to Ellis Island via Robbins Reef. A charter was granted to the Staten Island Bridge Company, but the project was eventually abandoned due to fiscal constraints.

The proposal to build a railroad bridge over the Arthur Kill existed from at least 1886, when Erastus Wiman, a developer who was founder and president of the Staten Island Railway, persuaded the Baltimore and Ohio Railroad to finance a bridge over the Arthur Kill in exchange for use of Wiman's railroad facilities on the island.

In the summer of 1886 the Board of Army Engineers for Fortifications held a hearing at the Army Building in Manhattan to determine the preferred location for the interstate bridge that had recently been authorized by Congress. Speaking in favor of the bridge were representatives of the Baltimore and Ohio Railroad and Erastus Wiman. Opposed to the proposed location were Senator Chase, representing the Pennsylvania Railroad, and I. L. Fisher of the Bee Towing Company. The opponents preferred building a 70-foot-high (21.34 m) bridge near Buckwheat Island, about one mile (1.6 km) south of the proposed location. The Board reported to the Secretary of War.

== Description and history ==
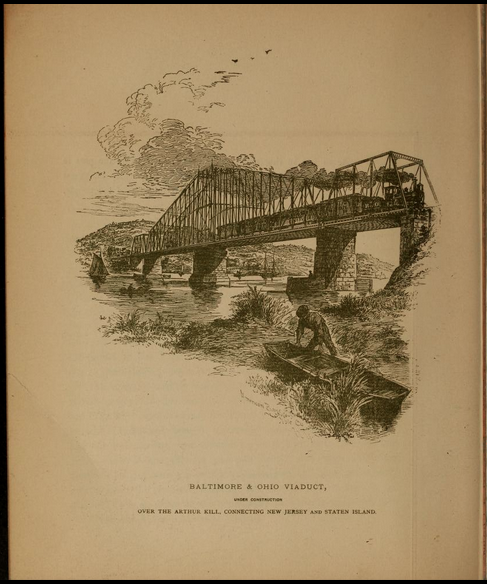
Rendering of the proposed bridge in 1885

The approved bridge was designed by Charles Ackenheit (or Ackenheil), the chief engineer for the Baltimore and Ohio Railroad. The cost was approximately $500,000. Construction occurred from 1887 to 1889 and the bridge opened with ceremony on January 1, 1890. It was also called the "Achter Kill Bridge" after the alternate spelling and pronunciation of Arthur Kill. At the time of its completion, it was the longest of its type in the world.

It was a swing-span railroad bridge with a center pier, connecting the Howland Hook area of Staten Island to Elizabeth, New Jersey, where tracks could connect with a Baltimore and Ohio branch line. The center span was 500 feet (152 m) long, with two fixed 150 feet (45.7 m) side spans, for a total length of 800 feet (244 m). Compared to the 70-foot high (21.34 m) bridge proposed by the Pennsylvania Railroad, the bridge was built only 32 feet (9.75 m) above Arthur Kill at low water. This would necessitate frequent openings, especially in later years after the kill was dredged and numerous ocean-going ships needed to pass through the strait. In 1952, for example, the bridge was required to be open to allow 13,346 ships to pass. The span was moved by two steam-powered engines. In foggy weather a steam whistle would sound twice to indicate the bridge was closed, or four times so boats would know it was open.

The bridge was used for freight trains. There was never any regular passenger service over the bridge, although during both World War I and World War II, numerous troop trains would deliver soldiers bound for Europe to ships waiting at the Staten Island port of embarkation piers. Also, in October 1957, a train carrying Queen Elizabeth II and Prince Philip from Washington to the Staten Island Ferry during a state visit crossed the bridge.

In late 1952, the swing span was turned by heavy winds and could not be closed for some time. At other times at least one ship crashed into the bridge, and there was at least one case where boats collided while navigating under the bridge. By the 1950s the bridge was considered outdated and a hazard to navigation. A replacement bridge, the Arthur Kill Vertical Lift Bridge, was built 150 feet (45.7 m) away from the Arthur Kill Bridge. The new bridge, financed primarily by the federal government, had a center span 58 feet (17.7 m) longer than the old bridge, with no center pier, and its clearance was more than 100 feet (30.5 m) higher than the old span. The new bridge was inaugurated in August 1959, and the Arthur Kill Bridge was then removed; its granite piers had to be blasted away.
