= Transloading =

Shipment transfer to different mode of transport

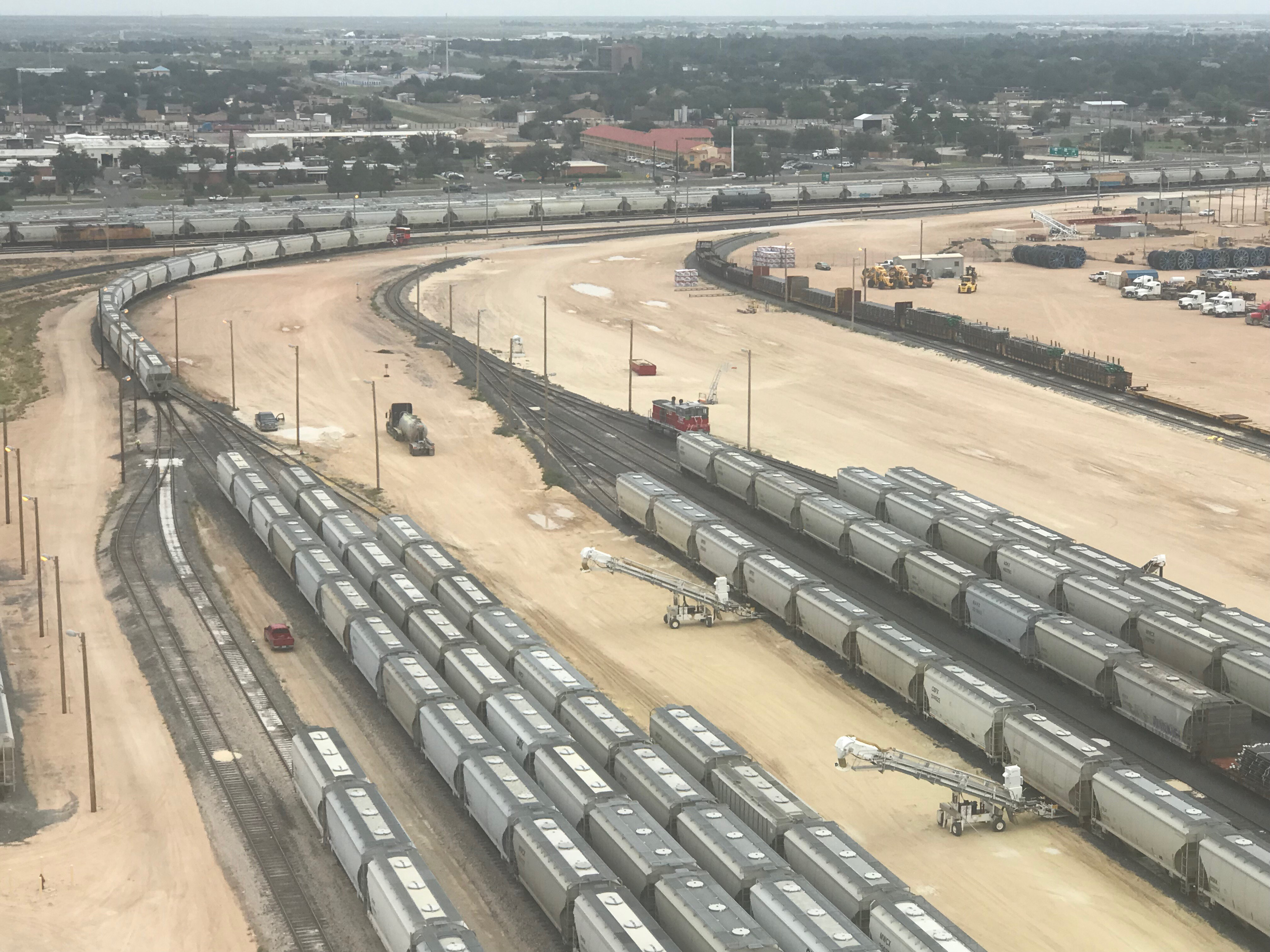
A transloading facility in Texas, between rail and road transport

Transloading, also known as cross-docking, is the process of transferring a shipment from one mode of transportation to another. It is most commonly employed when one mode cannot be used for the entire trip, such as when goods must be shipped internationally from one inland point to another. Such a trip might require transport by truck to an airport, then by airplane overseas, and then by another truck to its destination; or it might involve bulk material (such as coal) loaded to rail at the mine and then transferred to a ship at a port. Transloading is also required at railroad break-of-gauge points, since the equipment can not pass from one track to another unless bogies are exchanged.

Since transloading requires handling of the goods, it causes a higher risk of damage. Therefore, transloading facilities are designed with the intent of minimizing handling. Due to differing capacities of the different modes, the facilities typically require some storage facility, such as warehouses or rail yards. For bulk goods, specialized material handling and storage are typically provided (as, for example, in grain elevators). Intermodal transport limits handling by using standardized containers, which are handled as units and which also serve for storage if needed.

== Transloading versus transshipment ==
Transloading may be confused with transshipment, but in modern usage they represent different concepts. Transloading concerns the mechanics of transport, while transshipment is essentially a legal term addressing how the shipment originates and is destined. Consider a load of grain that is transloaded at an elevator, where it is combined with grain from other farms and thus leaves on the train as a distinct shipment from that in which it arrived. It thus cannot be said to be transshipped. Or consider a package shipped through a package delivery service or by mail: it may change shipping mode several times along the trip, but since it is (from an external point of view) conveyed as a single shipment regardless of how it is conveyed or what else travels with it on the legs of its journey, it is not considered to be transshipped. Conversely, a load on a truck can be taken in one (legal) shipment to an intermediate point and then to its ultimate destination without ever leaving the truck. If this is specified as two shipments, then the goods are transshipped, but no transloading has taken place.

The modern distinction between transloading and transshipment was not well codified in the period of the mid-19th through mid-20th centuries, when discussions of break of gauge often used the word transshipment for what today's careful usage would call transloading, or for any combination of transloading and transshipment.

== Transloading facilities ==
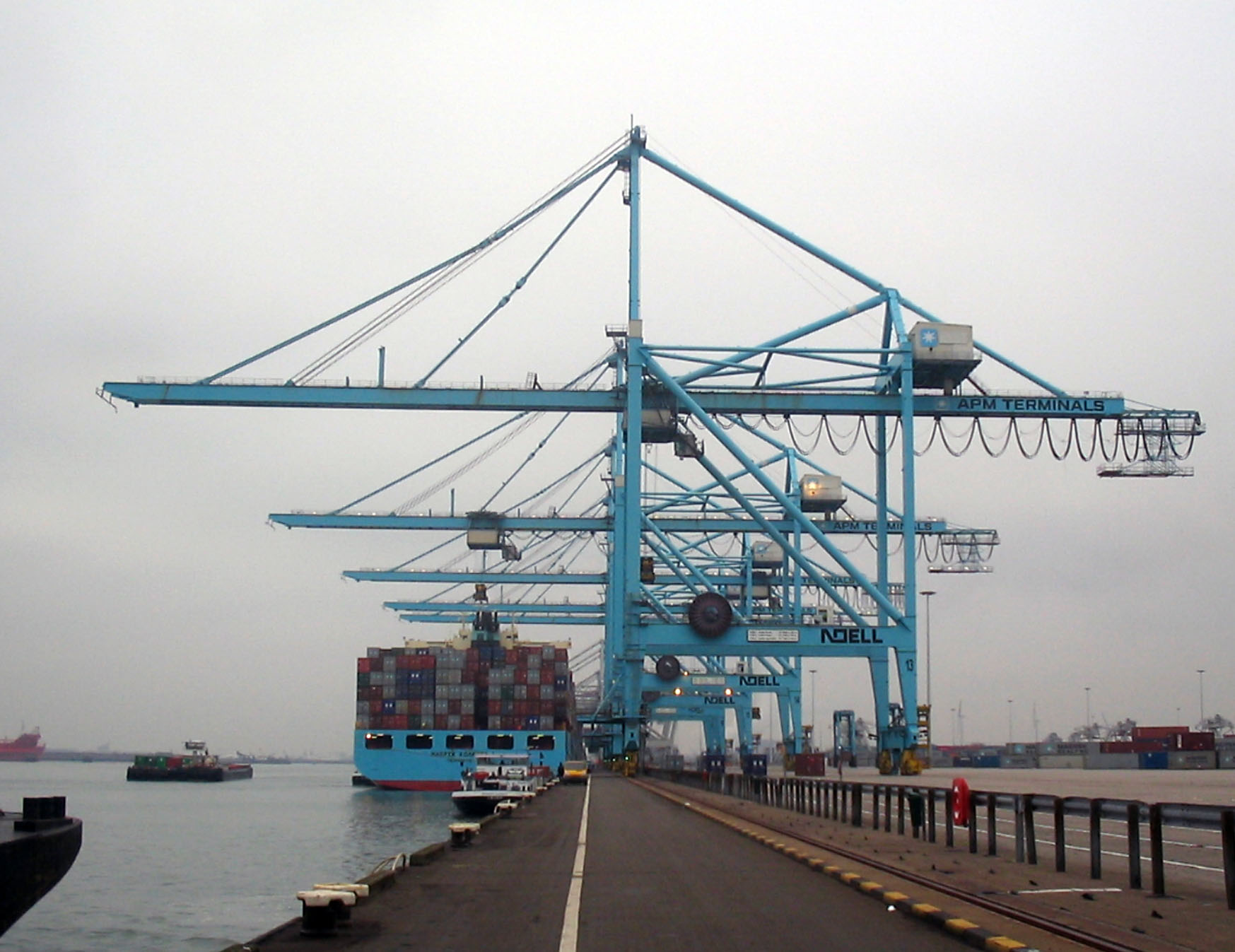
Container cranes are used to transfer containers to/from container ships.

Transloading can occur at any place. A truck can pull up to another truck or a train, and transloading may be accomplished by no more elaborate means than teamsters and stevedores. In the interests of speed and efficiency, however, a variety of specialized equipment is used to handle the goods. Thus, intermodal facilities have specialized cranes for handling the containers, and coal piers have car dumpers, loaders, conveyors, and other equipment for unloading and loading railroad cars and ships quickly and with a minimum of personnel. Transloading facilities may also make use of a Bulk Transloading System to provide visibility of a transloading operation including rail, storage, over the road drivers, dray drivers, bookings, and the master load plan.

Often the equipment used to ship the goods is optimized for rapid transfer. For instance, the shipment of automobiles is expedited by autorack rail cars and roll-on/roll-off ships, which can be loaded without cranes or other equipment. Standardized containers allow the use of common handling equipment and obviate break bulk handling.

Transloading is often combined with classification and routing facilities, since the latter often require handling of goods. Transloading may occur at railway sidings and break-of-gauge stations.

Where ports are too small to handle large bulk carrier ships, transloading can occur at sea, using transhipment platforms, ships, or floating cranes and barges.

== See also ==
- ExpressRail
