= Chemical Coast =

Section of Union and Middlesex counties in New Jersey

The New Jersey Turnpike & Conrail Chemical Coast Line, facing north between exits 12 & 13. Bayway Refinery is in the background

The Chemical Coast is a section of Union and Middlesex counties in New Jersey located along the shores of the Arthur Kill, across from Staten Island, New York. The name is taken from the Conrail Chemical Coast Line, an important component in the ExpressRail system serving marine terminals in the Port of New York and New Jersey.

== History ==
=== 19th century ===
The name was first used by Conrail to designate a freight railway line that served several chemical plants in the area. The rail line was started by the Perth Amboy and Elizabethport Railroad in 1871. However, the company ran out of capital during the panic of 1873 and was purchased by the Central Railroad of New Jersey (CNJ).

The CNJ operated both freight and passenger service along the line into the twentieth century, referring to it as the Perth Amboy and Elizabethport Branch. Passenger trains to Bay Head Junction, Atlantic Highlands, Freehold and Atlantic City (including the Blue Comet) utilized the line. There were passenger stations at Newark Airport, Elizabethport, Carteret, and Sewaren. At Elizabethport the CNJ also operated a car repair shop. Passenger service along the line ended in 1967 with the advent of the Aldene Plan when the Bay Head trains (the line's only remaining commuter service) were moved to Newark Penn Station. In 1976 Conrail took over ownership of the line and operation of the substantial freight business the line generated.

The CNJ constructed a two-track bridge over lower Newark Bay in 1864, and upgraded it to a dual pair of four-track lift bridges known collectively as the CRRNJ Newark Bay Bridge in 1926. This bridge offered a route and service through Bayonne and access to the Communipaw Terminal with ferry service to New York City. After the Conrail takeover the bridge between Bayonne and Elizabethport was demolished in the 1980s, but some of the stone piers were left standing along the shores of Newark Bay.

In 1872, the Singer Manufacturing Company of New York opened a factory in Elizabethport along Trumbull Street next to the intersection of the CNJ mainline with the Perth Amboy and Elizabethport Branch. In 1873 Singer became a New Jersey corporation.

The factory survived a major fire May 6–7, 1890. During World War II much of the production capacity of the factory was shifted to war related work, with M1911 pistols being one of several items produced at Elizabethport. The factory was shut down in the late 1960s. The brick factory built by Singer served as an industrial park in 2009.

=== 20th century ===
In 1907, John D. Rockefeller, the founder of the Standard Oil company, acquired several hundred acres of the former Morse family estate between Linden and Elizabeth for what would become the Bayway Refinery. Construction of the facility took place the following year and the first crude oil stills were fired up on January 2, 1909. The facility underwent a series of ownership changes and capacity expansions throughout the twentieth century. By 2002 it was owned by ConocoPhillips.

The Shell Oil Company opened a terminal facility on a 145-acre (59 ha) former Boynton farm property along Arbor Street in Sewaren in 1928. The terminal was transferred to the Motiva Enterprises Shell subsidiary during the 20th century and expanded to a 4.2 million barrels (670 Ml) storage capacity with connections to the Colonial pipeline and barge docks on the Arthur Kill in addition to the rail connections. The facility now handles gasoline, diesel fuel, jet fuel, ethanol, and fuel mixtures.

Emissions from the area's chemical plants have been blamed for some serious health problems that have been observed among residents of neighborhoods on Staten Island situated directly across the Arthur Kill, specifically an elevated rate of cancer found to exist among long-time denizens of Travis. Strange—though not necessarily unpleasant—odors often waft across the Arthur Kill, and affect air quality not only on Staten Island's West Shore, where Travis is located, but parts of the island's South Shore and Mid-Island regions as well.

=== 21st century ===
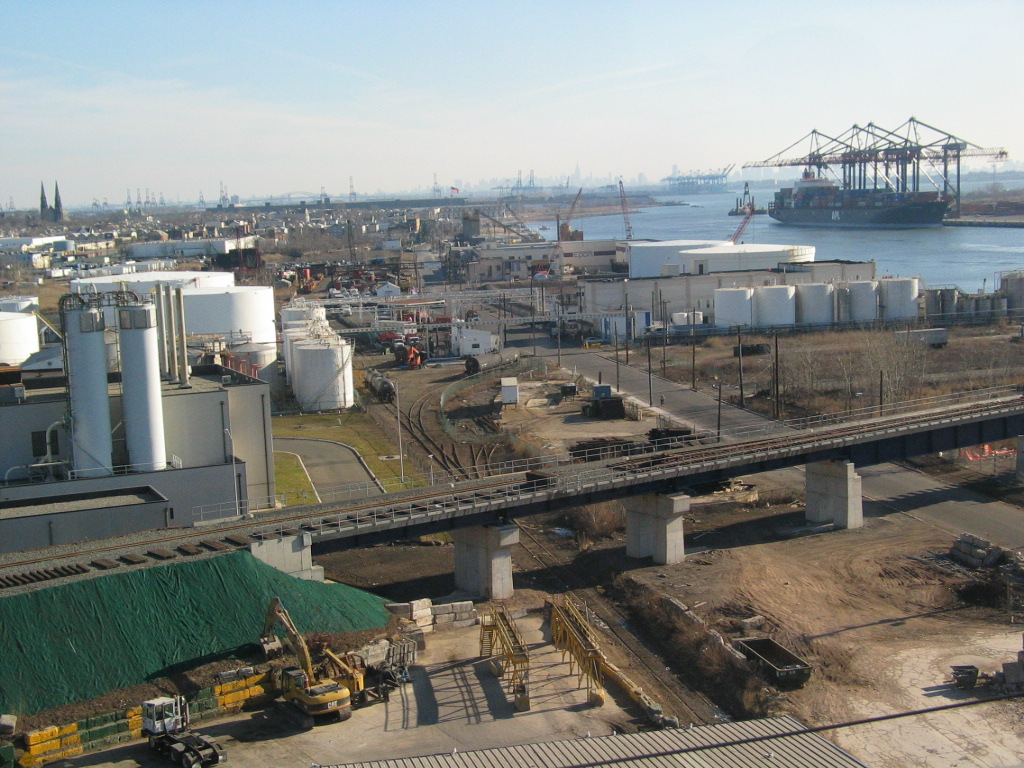
Tank cars parked on a spur of the Chemical Coast Line that passes under the Staten Island Railway in Elizabeth in November 2006 with a container ship being unloaded at Howland Hook on the right

A freight line connection from New Jersey to the Staten Island Railway, via the Chemical Coast line, has been restored as of late 2006, and is operated by the Morristown and Erie Railway under contract with the State of New Jersey. The railroad bridge over the Arthur Kill waterway has also been restored, and at least one freight train has made the crossing in 2006 from New Jersey to Staten Island. Plans are to reactivate the North Shore of the Staten Island Railway to allow freight shipments to and from the recently revamped Howland Hook Marine Terminal.

The current Chemical Coast connection to Staten Island is freight service only, although separate plans are also being studied to reactivate passenger service on the North Shore Branch on Staten Island. Some of these latter proposals would run passenger trains to Cranford Junction, while others call for a western terminus at either the former Arlington or Port Ivory stations on Staten Island.

== Ethanol transshipment ==
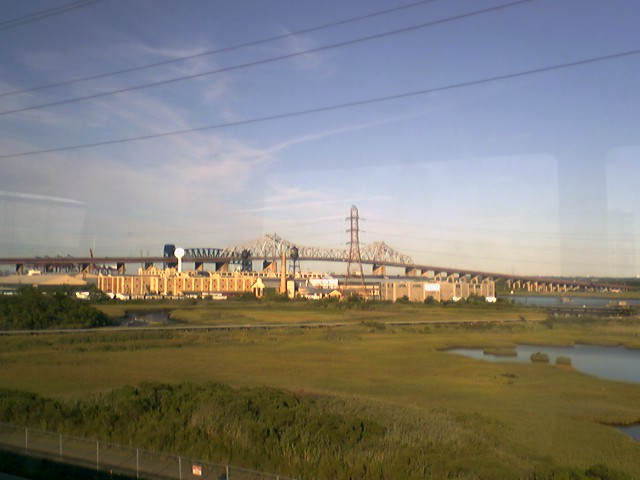
Salt marshes seen from the New Jersey Turnpike in Elizabeth. In the distance is the Goethals Bridge, and behind that the Arthur Kill Bridge, both going to Staten Island

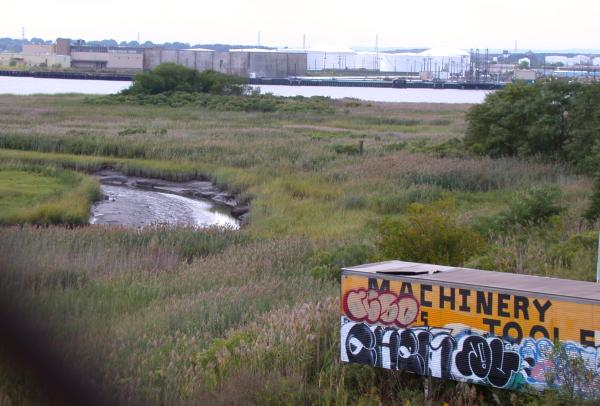
Petrochemical storage tanks in Carteret as seen from Staten Island and over the Arthur Kill

In August 2006, the Linden Terminal intermodal facility started operating on Point Tremley along the Arthur Kill in Linden. The facility transfers ethanol for fuel use between barges, rail cars, trucks, and temporary storage tanks.

== Biodiesel production ==
In May 2007, The Star-Ledger reported that New Jersey–based biodiesel producer Fuel Bio "is trying to plant a green footprint on New Jersey's notorious Chemical Coast." The company is a producer of biofuels located inside of New York Terminals, whose production facility is located in Elizabeth, New Jersey, across the Arthur Kill from Staten Island.

== Incidents ==
- On October 25, 1972, an oil barge docked in Carteret, exploding and causing fires and oil slicks in Arthur Kill.
- On April 12, 1973, a fire broke out at the GATX oil tank farm and docking facilities in Carteret, New Jersey.
- In 1995, at an Amoco fuel storage depot in Carteret, a spray of fuel vapor created a fire.
- On September 29, 2000, at 4:55 a.m., a tank car carrying more than 27,000 US gallons (100,000 L) of butane derailed while switching off to a siding along the Chemical Coast line in Woodbridge, New Jersey. Residents of 163 houses were evacuated while the cleanup effort took place. The car was rerailed and put back into service undamaged later that day.
- On January 25, 2005, an accidental gas explosion killed three workers and injured a fourth at the Acetylene Service Company plant in Perth Amboy.
- On March 12, 2009, at 10:16 a.m., a tank car carrying isopropyl acetate through Carteret developed a leak. Conrail contacted the Carteret Fire Department and the Middlesex County Hazmat Response Team for assistance. The leak was fixed by 12:04 p.m. after a spill of 100 US gallons (380 L) had already taken place.
- In 2012, as a result of Hurricane Sandy, a storage facility owned by Motiva Enterprises, LLC ruptured and spilled 350,000 gallons of fuel into Arthur Kill.
- On July 5, 2016, at the Freeport McMoRan facility in Carteret, four chemical drums ruptured and emitted fumes; several firefighters were taken to the hospital for exposure.

== See also ==
Related railroads:
- Central Railroad of New Jersey (1839–1976)
- Conrail Shared Assets Operations
- Easton and Amboy Railroad
- Newark and New York Railroad
- Perth Amboy and Elizabethport Railroad (1869–1873)
- Perth Amboy and Woodbridge Railroad
- Port Reading Railroad
- Penns Grove Secondary
Nearby watercourses:
- Arthur Kill
- Elizabeth River
- Morses Creek
- Piles Creek
- Rahway River
Other topics:
- Bayway Refinery
- Port Reading Refinery
- Port of Paulsboro
- Raritan Bayshore
- T. A. Gillespie Company Shell Loading Plant explosion, in nearby South Amboy
