= Arthur Kill Vertical Lift Bridge =

Bridge between New Jersey and New York

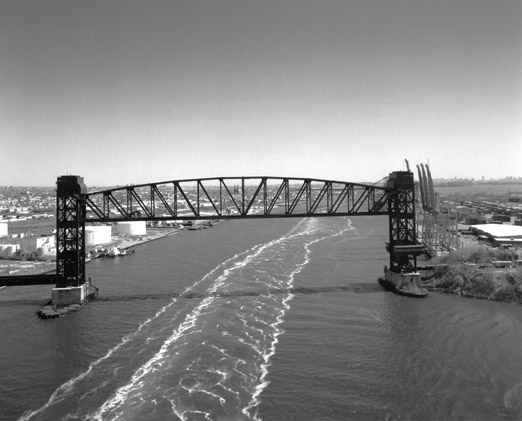
- Coordinates: 40.637518°N 74.195486°W
- Carries: Conrail Shared Assets Operations
- Crosses: Arthur Kill
- Locale: Elizabeth, New Jersey and Staten Island, New York, United States
- Owner: New York City Economic Development Corporation

Characteristics
- Design: Vertical-lift bridge
- Height: 215 feet (66 m)
- Longest span: 558 feet (170 m)
- Clearance below: 135 feet (41 m) open 31 feet (9.4 m) closed

Rail characteristics
- No. of tracks: 1
- Track gauge: 4 ft 8 1/2 in (1,435 mm) standard gauge
- Structure gauge: AAR
- Electrified: None

History
- Opened: August 25, 1959; reopened October 4, 2006

Location
- Interactive map of Arthur Kill Vertical Lift Bridge

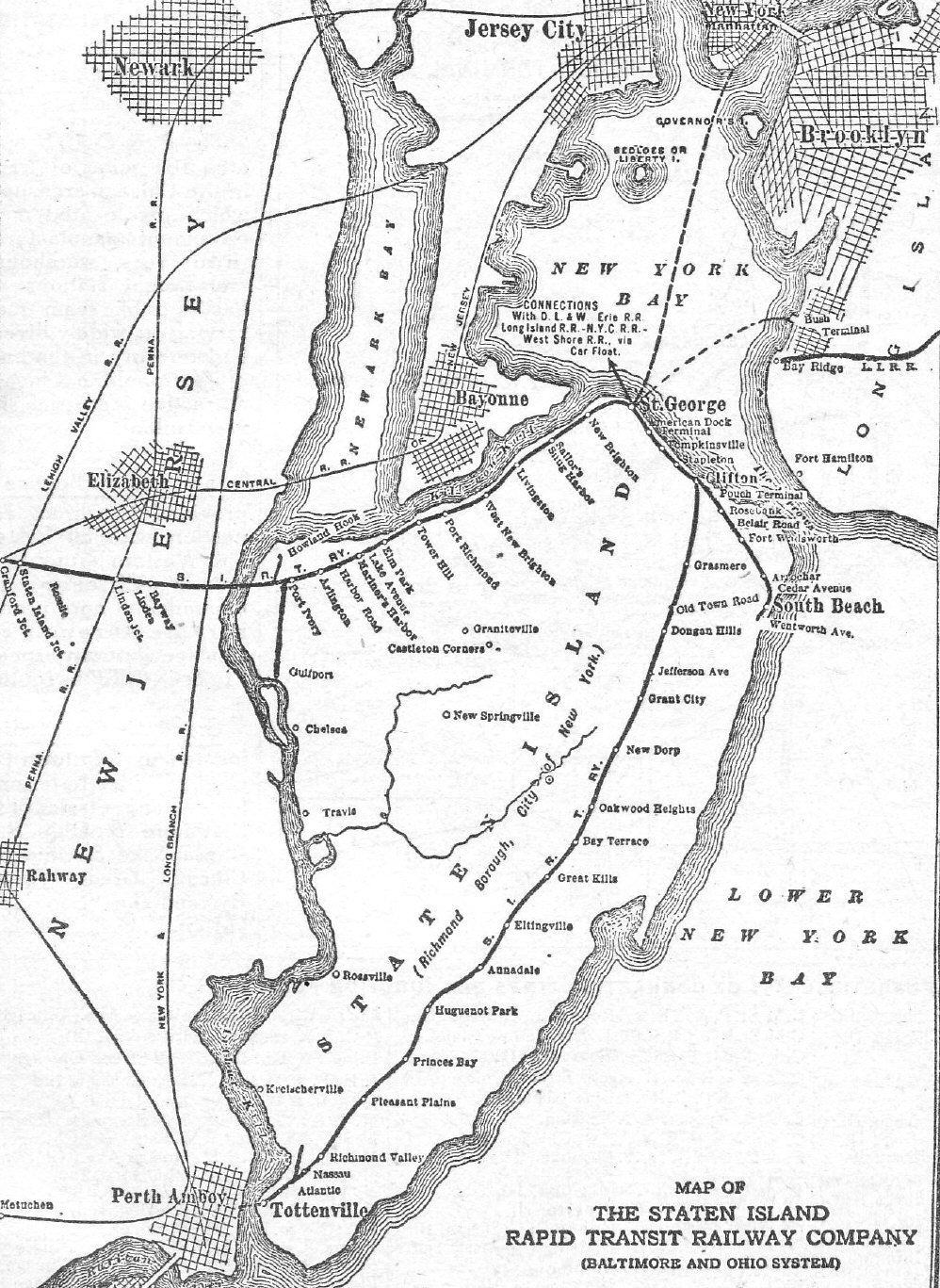
The bridge connects the western bulge in Staten Island, upper left, with the New Jersey mainland.

The Arthur Kill Vertical Lift Bridge is a rail vertical-lift bridge connecting Elizabethport, New Jersey, and the Howland Hook Marine Terminal on Staten Island, New York, United States. The bridge was built by the Baltimore and Ohio Railroad in 1959 to replace the Arthur Kill Bridge, a swing bridge opened in 1890. It contains a single track that is used mainly to carry garbage out of New York City, as well as to transport freight to destinations in western Staten Island. The bridge parallels the Goethals Bridge, which carries Interstate 278.

The Arthur Kill Bridge has the longest lift span of any vertical-lift bridge in the world, with two 215-foot (66 m) towers and a 558-foot (170 m) truss span that allows a 500-foot (152 m) channel. It clears mean high water by 31 feet (9.45 m) when closed and 135 feet (41 m) when lifted.

== First period of use ==
After the bridge opened in 1959 upon having replaced the Arthur Kill Bridge, rail traffic declined due to loss of manufacturing facilities on Staten Island. Bethlehem Steel closed in 1960, U.S. Gypsum in 1972, U.S. Lines-Howland Hook Marine Terminal in 1986, and Procter and Gamble in 1991. A shift to truck traffic also reduced rail traffic over the bridge, and the North Shore branch of rail service went through a series of owners. The three companies that owned the North Branch were B&O Railroad, CSX, and the Delaware Otsego Corporation. They saw the bridge as excess property. The last freight train went over the Arthur Kill Lift Bridge in 1990, and North Shore branch service ceased to operate until 2007.

== Second period of use ==
In 1994, the New York City Economic Development Corporation (NYCEDC) purchased the Arthur Kill Railroad Lift Bridge and the North Shore branch from CSX. In December 2004, NYCEDC and the Port Authority of New York and New Jersey announced a $72 million project to rehabilitate the bridge and reactivate freight rail service on Staten Island. Repairs included repainting the steel and rehabilitating the lift mechanism. The bridge was painted royal blue in an homage to the B&O. The rehabilitation project was completed in June 2006.

On October 4, 2006, a train crossed the bridge for the first time in 16 years. It was a single locomotive which took on switching duties at the New York Container Terminal, also known by its old name, Howland Hook.

On April 2, 2007, normal operations involving garbage removal from the Staten Island Transfer Station started, which would result in an estimated 90,000 annual truck loads diverted from the nearby Goethals Bridge. On October 4, 2007, New York Container Terminal, which operates Howland Hook, announced the opening of on-dock rail service called ExpressRail via the bridge, with regular service by Conrail (CRCX), CSX and Norfolk Southern railroads. In 2013, Reworld signed a contract with the New York City Sanitation Department to barge containers of solid waste from transfer stations in Queens and Manhattan to New York Container Terminal where they will be transferred to rail cars for shipment to Covanta waste to energy plants.

Arthur Kill is a ship channel. The bridge is normally kept in the raised position (open to shipping), lowering to allow the passage of trains. As of 2018, U.S. Coast Guard regulations limit lowering the bridge to two 15-minute periods per day, with advance warning and restrictions on lowering during high tide. Conrail, which services Staten Island with one train a day, has stated that they do not see this limitation affecting current rail traffic levels, but it could become a problem if traffic increases significantly

== Image gallery ==
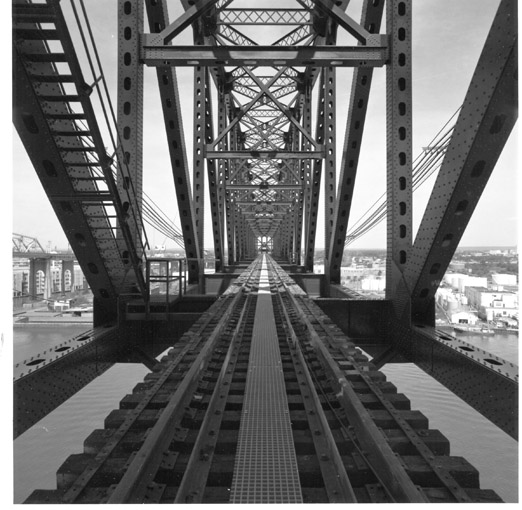
View of the track.

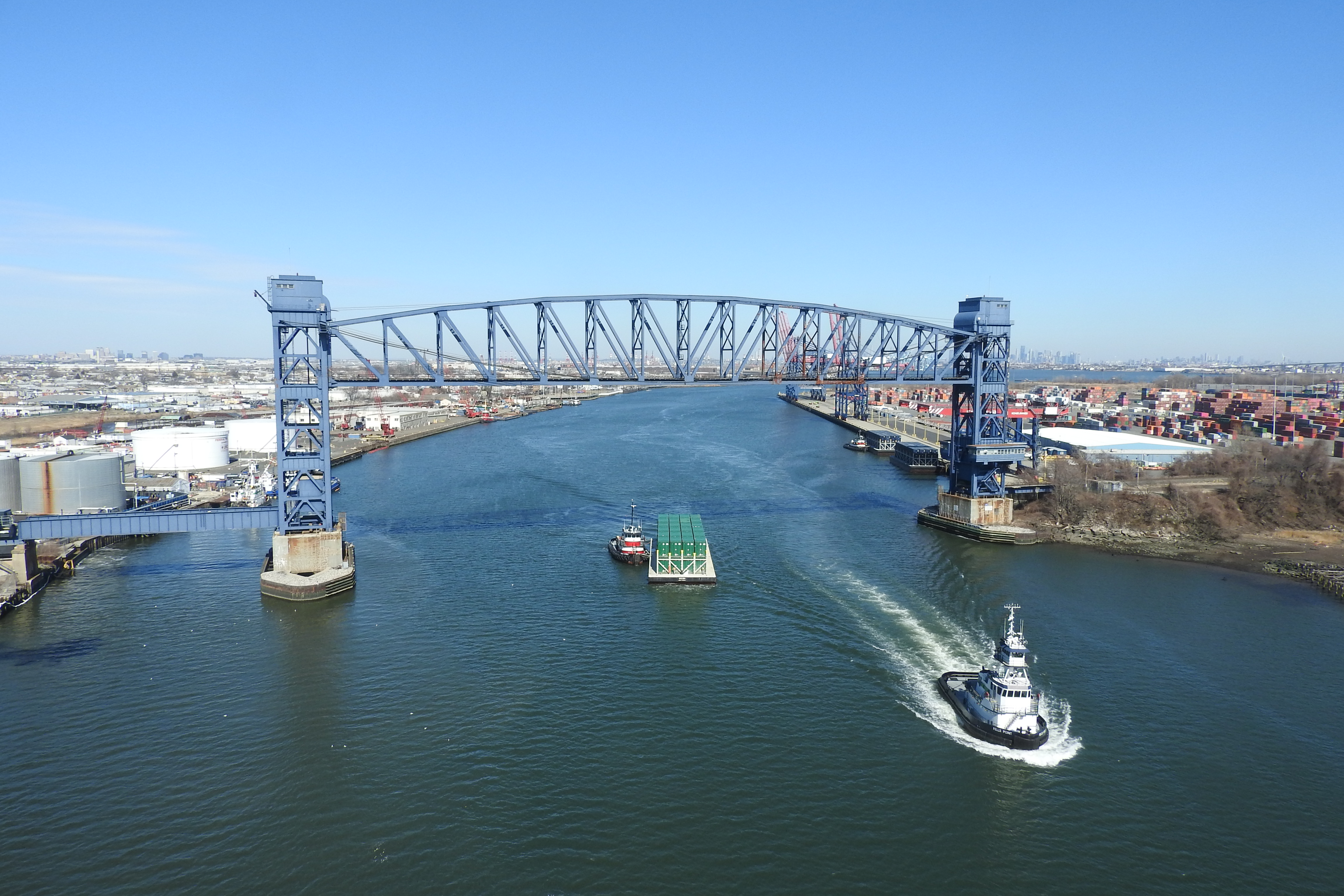

== See also ==
- Arlington Yard
- Staten Island Railway
