= ExpressRail =

Intermodal rail facilities at New York Harbor

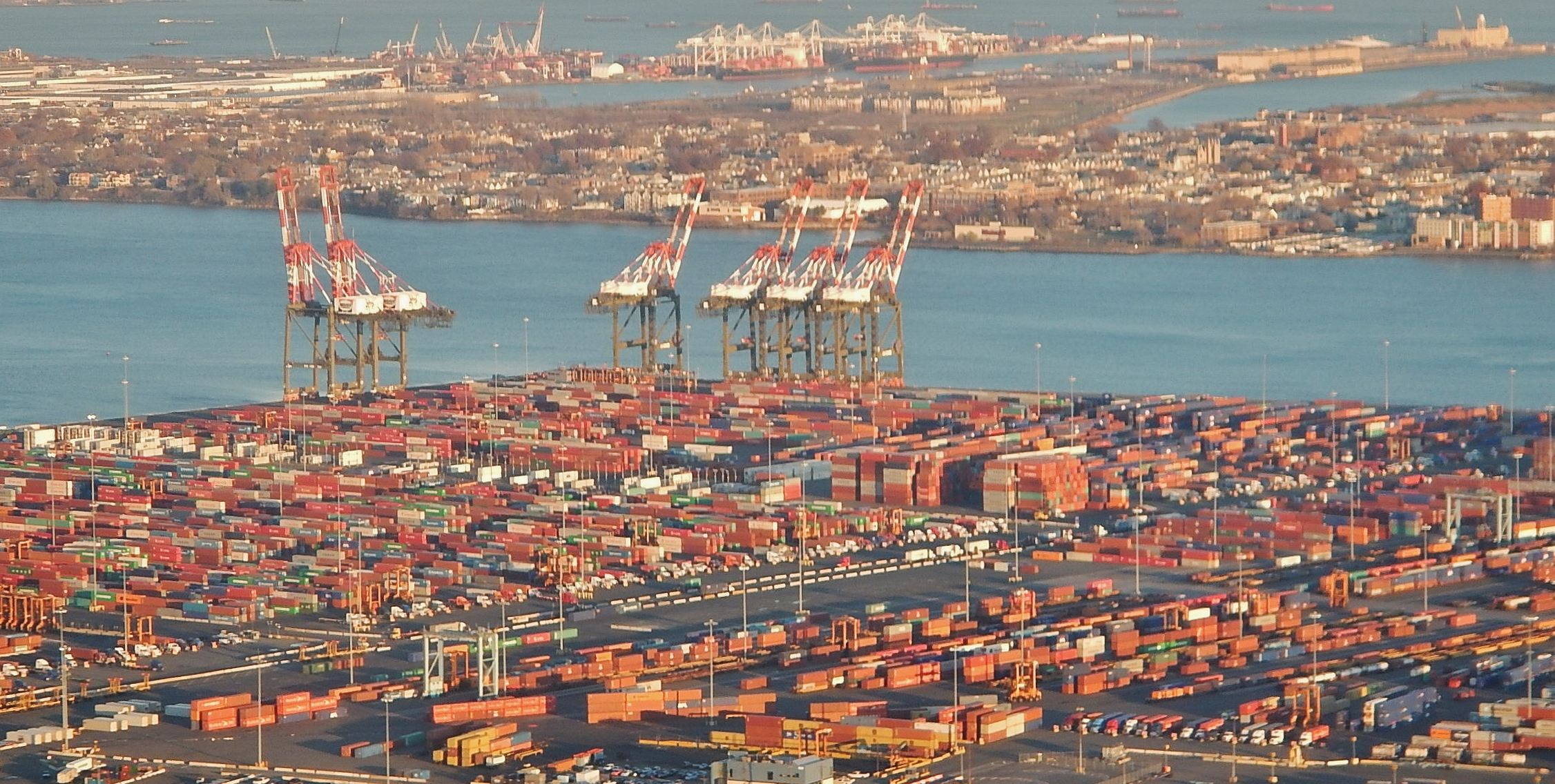
Port Newark on Newark Bay in foreground and Port Jersey on Upper New York Bay in the distance

ExpressRail is a network of on- or near-dock rail yards supporting intermodal freight transport at the major container terminals of the Port of New York and New Jersey. The development of dockside trackage and rail yards for transloading has been overseen by the Port Authority of New York and New Jersey, which works in partnership with other public and private stakeholders. As of 2019, four ExpressRail facilities were in operation, with a total built capacity of 1.5 million lifts.

Various switching and terminal railroads, including Conrail Shared Assets Operations (CRCX) on the Chemical Coast Secondary connect to the East Coast rail freight network carriers Norfolk Southern (NS) and CSX Transportation (CSX). Overall, the entire Express Rail system handled 433,000 containers in 2012, about 12 percent of the port’s total container volume. In the year period ending October 2014 the total amount of TEUS of Intermodal containers handled at the port included 391,596 rail lifts. Subsequent years have seen further increases in volume, rising to 646,000 lifts in 2018, and to 700,000 in 2020.

== Terminals and operations ==
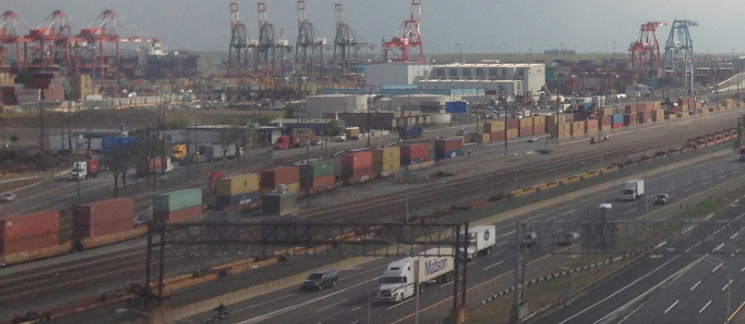
Elizabeth Marine Terminal, Chemical Coast (now known as the Garden State Secondary), and the New Jersey Turnpike

=== ExpressRail Elizabeth ===
The Elizabeth Marine Terminal (40°40′54″N 74°09′02″W), located on Newark Bay in Elizabeth, New Jersey, has the oldest and largest ExpressRail facility, opened in 2004. Originally started by the Port Authority of New York and New Jersey (PANYNJ) it is now operated and managed by subcontractor Millennium Marine Rail, a joint venture of Maher Terminals and APM Terminals, the major lessees and operators at the container terminal.

The terminal consists of 18 tracks. It originates 2-4 trains a day seven days a week:

=== ExpressRail Newark ===
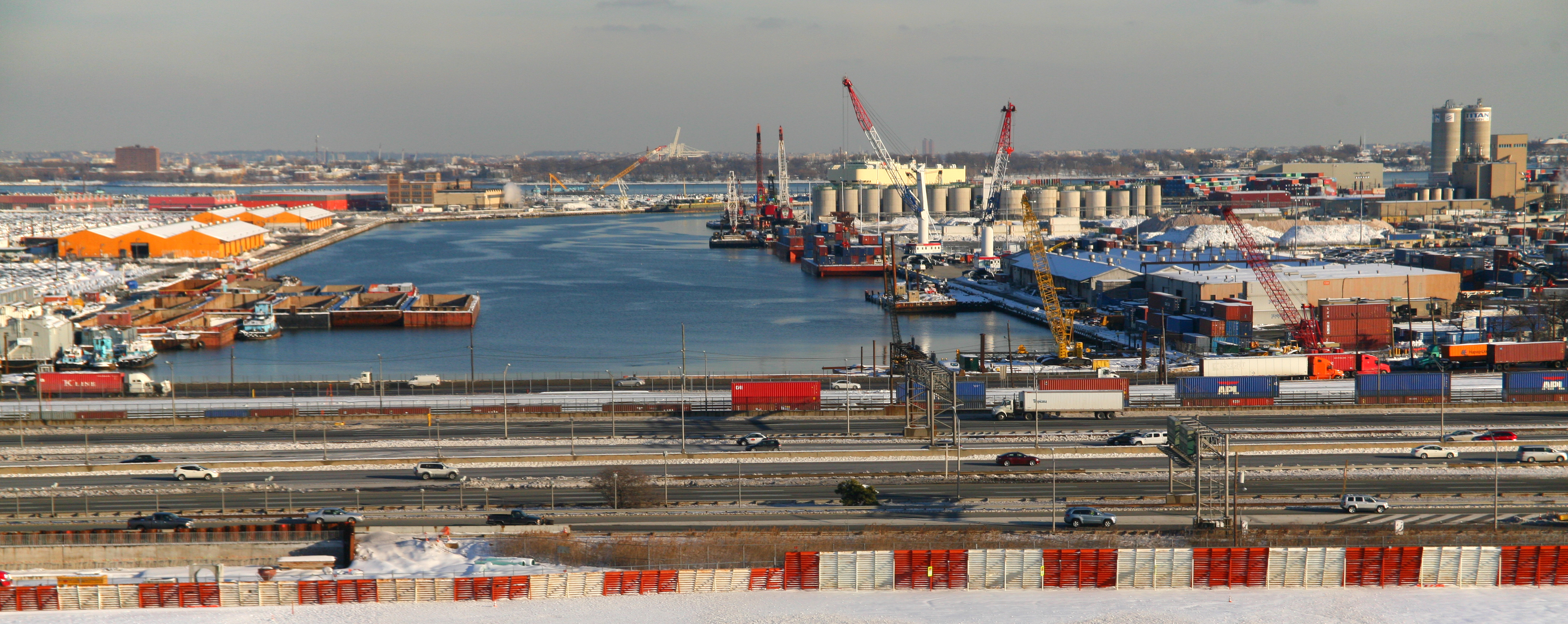
The Port Newark Corbin Street Yard lies on the Chemical Coast line, between the docks and the New Jersey Turnpike

Port Newark (40.6937949°N 74.1572903°W), lies north of the Elizabeth Marine Terminal, on Newark Bay in Newark, and handles containers and roll-on/roll-off shipping of automobiles. The intermodal yard consists of two tracks for loading of containers. It originates CSX Q163 and L163 to Syracuse-DeWitt and terminates CSX Q114 and Q162 from Syracuse-DeWitt.

In conjunction with installation of three new rail-specified, rubber-tired gantry cranes ExpressRail Newark is being expanded from two to four, doubling the rail track to 10,000 feet, and adding a new fly-over bridge. Work is expected to be completed in 2015.

In addition to containers, Port Newark is a major import/export center of automobiles using roll-on/roll-off operation between ship and rail. The adjacent Doremus Avenue Auto Terminal I & II is owned by Conrail and serves CSX and NS trains. The yard occupies 87 acres and has ten unloading tracks and ten holding tracks to serve multilevel autorack cars.

=== ExpressRail Staten Island ===
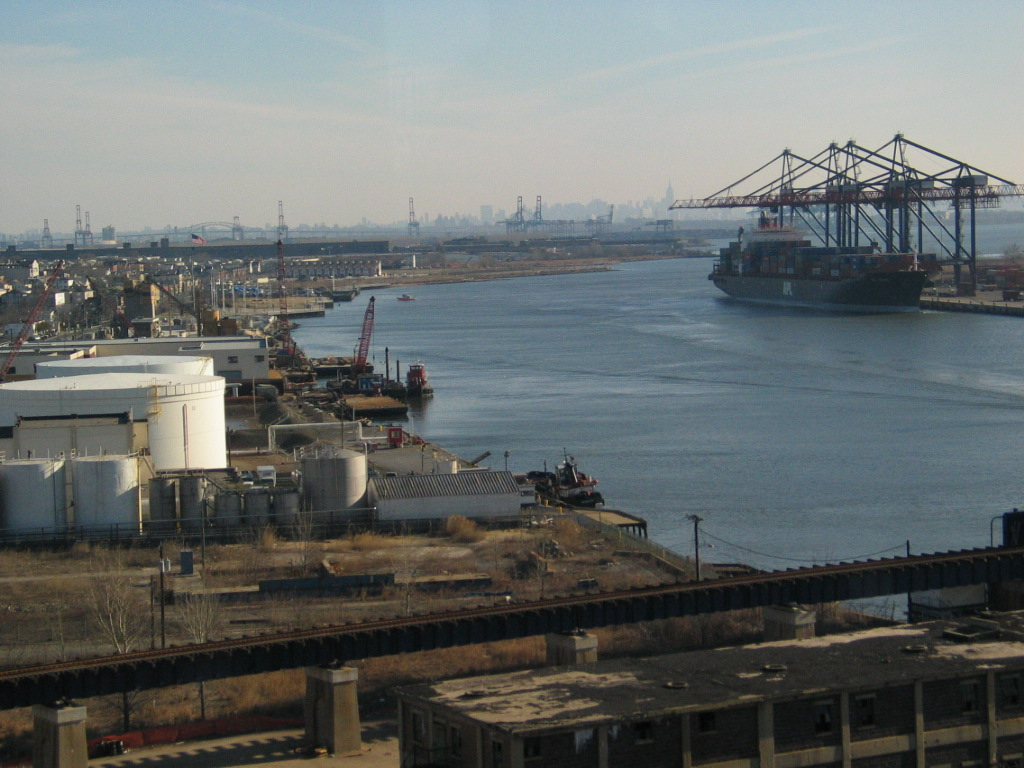
Staten Island Railroad (foreground) to Howland Hook travels the Arthur Kill Vertical Lift Bridge over the Arthur Kill and connects the Chemical Coast.

Port Liberty New York at Howland Hook Marine Terminal (40.6390858°N 74.1811125°W) is located at the mouth of the Arthur Kill at Newark Bay on Staten Island, a borough of New York City. Its on-dock ExpressRail facility consists of seven tracks which connect to the adjacent Arlington Yard, from which trains travel over the Arthur Kill Lift Bridge to connect to the Chemical Coast line at Elizabeth. Staten Island does not originate or terminate trains, but cars from the terminal are attached onto other trains.

The North Shore branch of the Staten Island Railway was originally opened in 1860 and was operated by the Baltimore and Ohio between Cranford, New Jersey and the Saint George Terminal. Passenger service on the North Shore Branch ended in 1953. In 1985, B&O successor CSX sold it to Delaware Otsego and rail freight service was continued until 1991. Freight service on the western North Shore Railroad right-of-way (ROW) at Howland Hook was revived in 2005. For the first time in 16 years a train crossed the bridge on October 4, 2006, a single locomotive which would take on switching duties. Rail at the marine terminal was reactivated in 2007 with the completion of the single-track Chemical Coast connector.

=== ExpressRail Port Jersey ===
CMA CGM operates the ExpressRail Port Jersey near-dock rail terminal at Port Jersey and serves the adjacent Port Liberty Bayonne semi-automated container terminal. Greenville Yard (40.67892°N 74.0734°W) is located on Upper New York Bay in Jersey City at the border with Bayonne. It is served by New York New Jersey Rail to reach the National Docks Secondary to access the national rail network.

The yard was originally part of the Pennsylvania Railroad Hudson Waterfront operations. That operation is now New York New Jersey Rail, which operates the last remaining car float operation in New York Harbor. Freight cars are barged across the bay to the Bush Terminal Yard and the 65th Street Yard in Brooklyn. Since the 2010 takeover by the PANYNJ extensive work to improve the cross-harbor system has been undertaken, though it was set back due to the effects of Hurricane Sandy in 2012.

PANYNJ broke ground on a $365 million improvement plan in December 2016. It opened in January 2019. It features 9,600 feet of working track, 32,000 feet of support track and switches, along with infrastructure to support dual cantilevered rail-mounted gantry cranes. It will initially support 125,000 container lifts a year. The PANYNJ will also build two new rail-to-barge transfer bridges, purchase two new car float barges, each with 18 rail car capacity, and buy four new ultra low emission locomotives, replacing antiquated units. Of the project’s $356 million cost, $320 million will be paid by the agency with the remainder coming from stakeholders. The New Jersey Department of Transportation allocated more than $87 million for 2014-2017 fiscal budget for the project and other related work, including land acquisition.

The first phase of the project, with four tracks and two gantry cranes, opened on January 7, 2019. The remainder of the project with four additional tracks was completed on June 17, 2019.

== Funding ==
The project began with an initial investment of $600 million by the PANYNJ. As of 2014, the cargo facilities charge (CFC) was $9.80 for every 40-foot shipping container passing through the port. The charge replaced a user fee of $57.50 per container that used the rail system in March 2011. The intention was to encourage use by spreading and lowering the cost.

== See also ==
- Oak Island Yard
- Timeline of Jersey City, New Jersey-area railroads
- Rail freight transportation in New York City and Long Island
- List of bridges, tunnels, and cuts in Hudson County, New Jersey
