= Howland Hook Marine Terminal =

Container port facility in New York City

Coordinates: 40°38.3′N 74°11.3′W

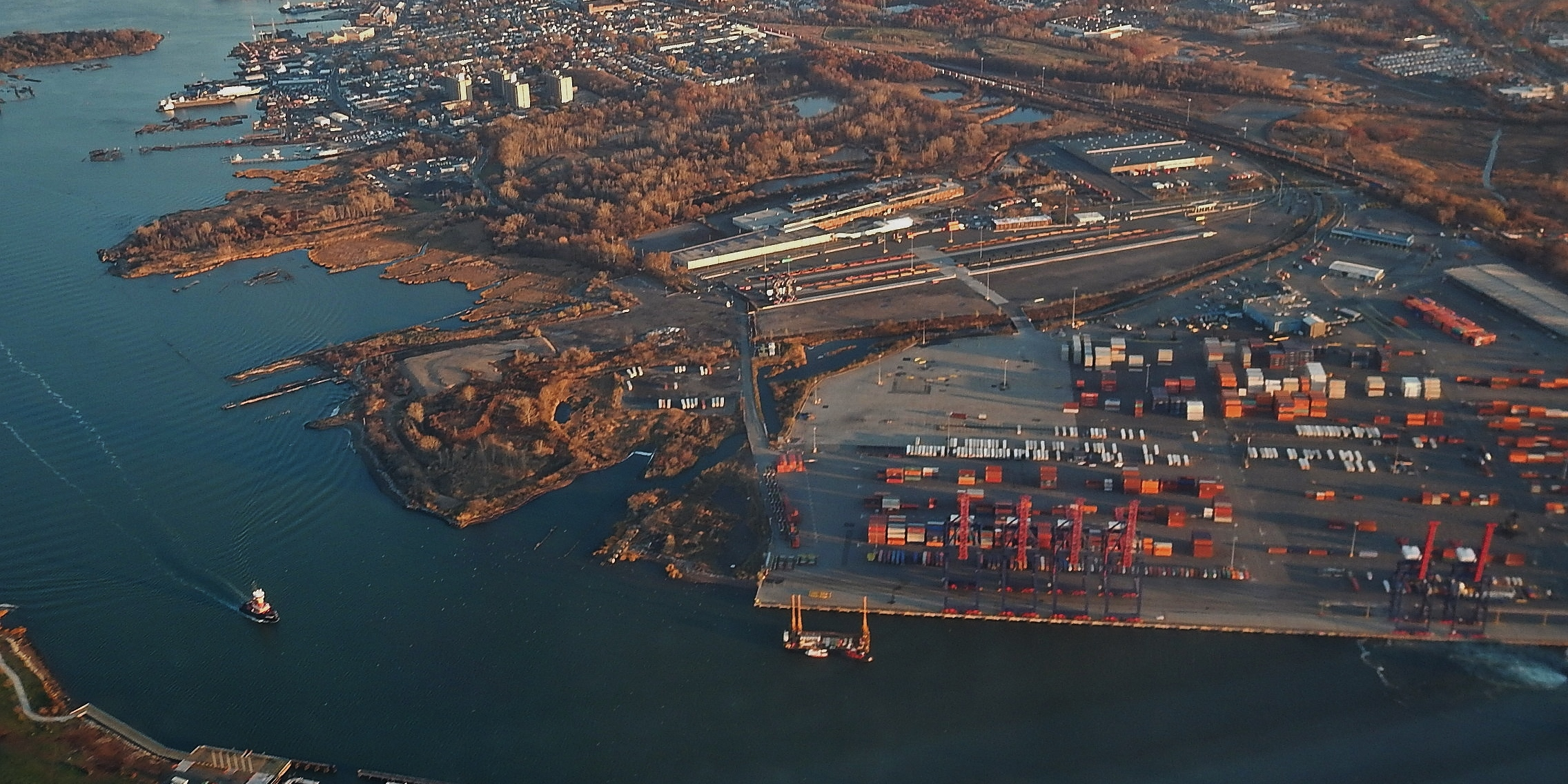
Aerial view

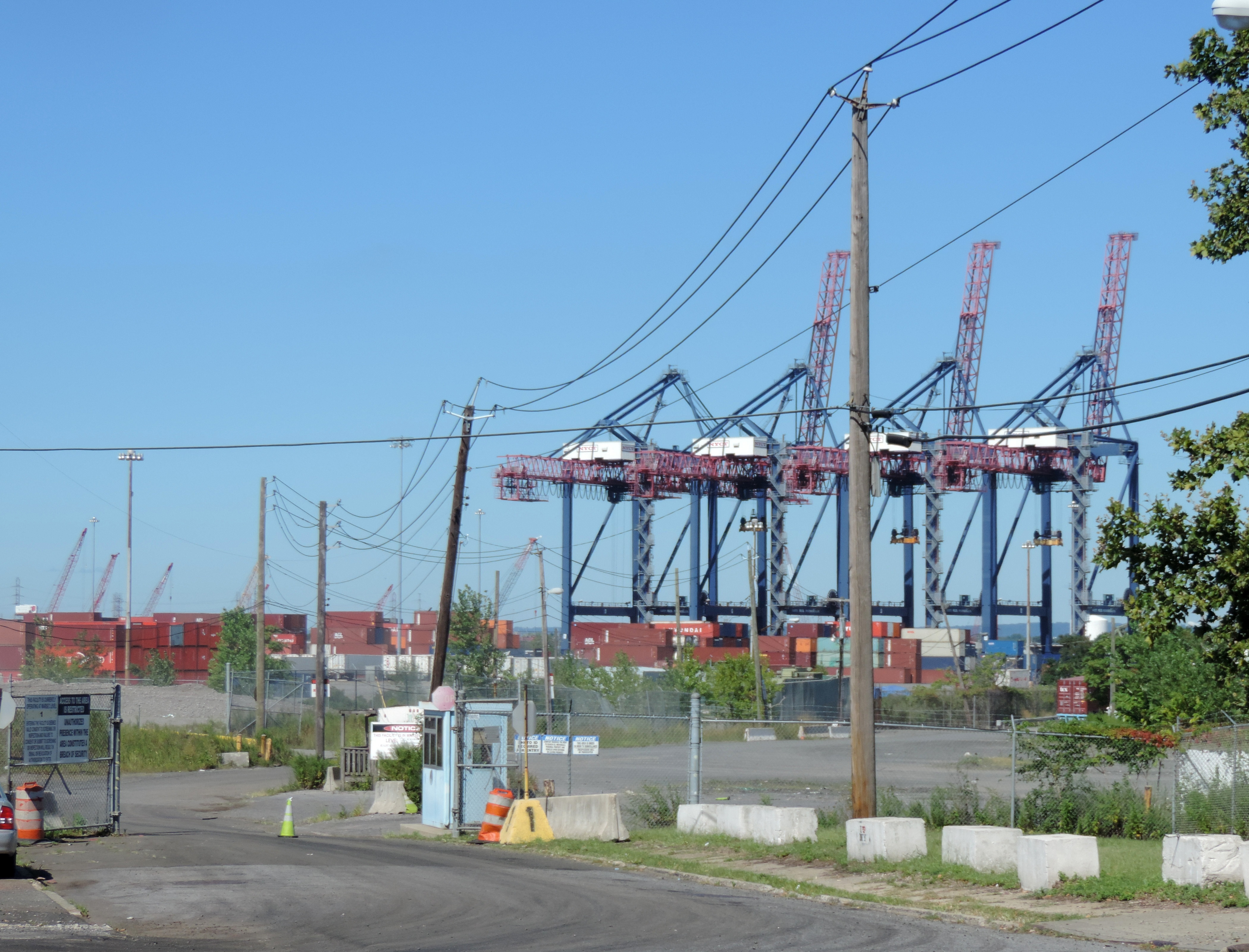
Northern entry gate and container cranes

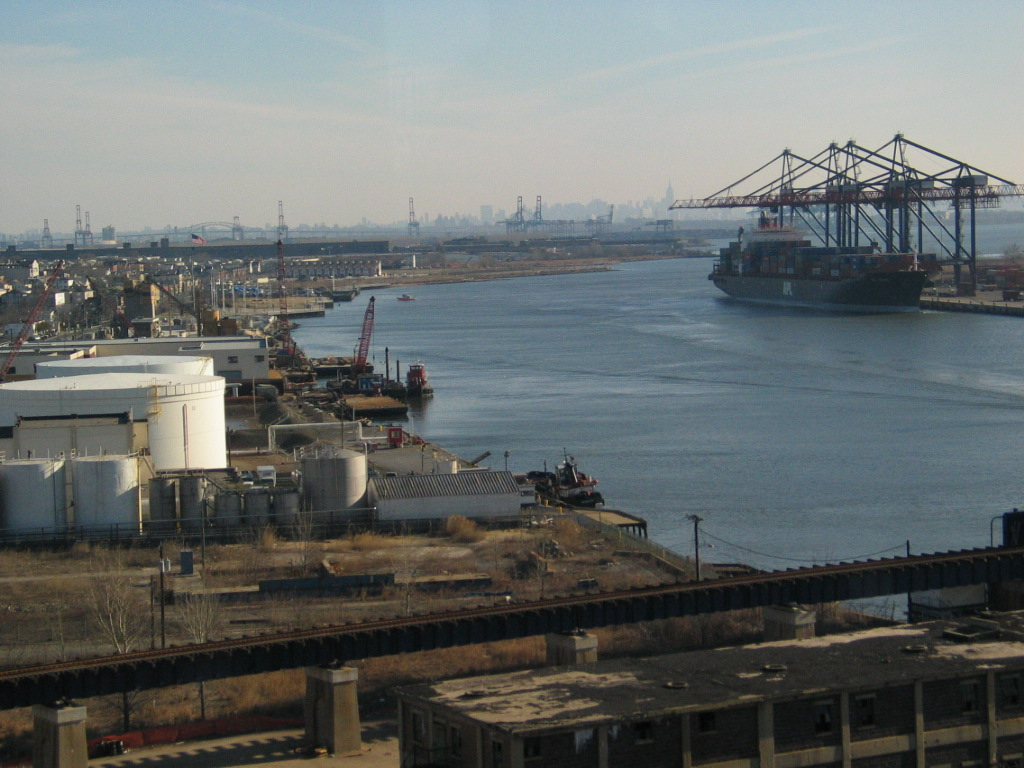
Looking northeast from the Chemical Coast across Arthur Kill, with Howland Hook Marine Terminal on far right, and Port Newark in distance

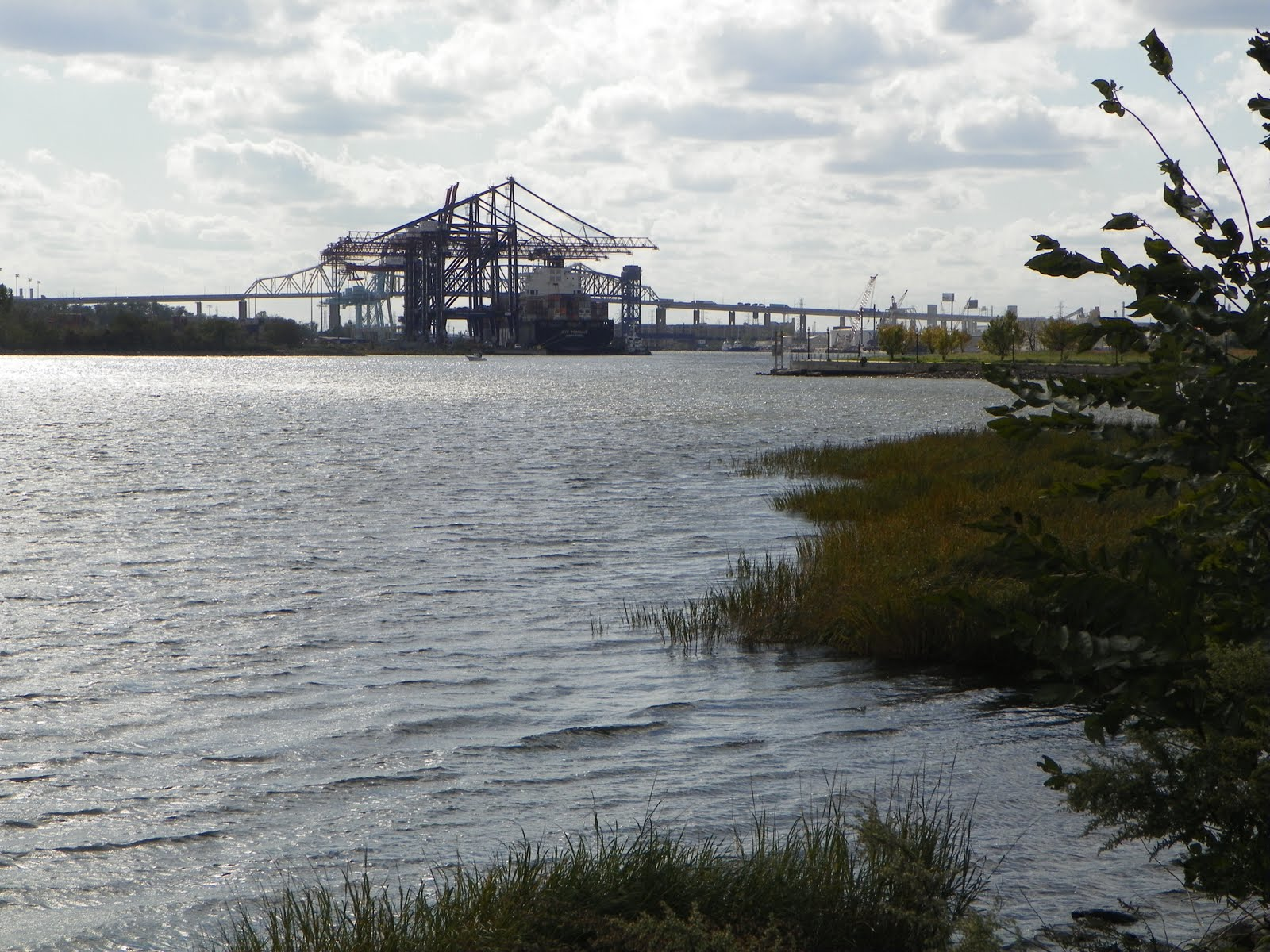
Howland Hook from John's Cove

The Howland Hook Marine Terminal, operating as Port Liberty New York, is a container port facility in the Port of New York and New Jersey located at Howland Hook in northwestern Staten Island, New York City. It is situated on the east side of the Arthur Kill, at the entrance to Newark Bay, just north of the Goethals Bridge and Arthur Kill Vertical Lift Bridge.

Built by American Export Lines, the site originally housed a B & O coal dumper, which was completed in 1949. The facility had a capacity of 100 cars per eight-hour shift. The dumped coal was delivered via barge to utilities in the harbor. It was in the process of being dismantled by mid-1965. The terminal was purchased in 1973 by the New York City government for $47.5 million, and United States Lines moved its container port operation there that year. In 1985, the Port Authority of New York and New Jersey (PANYNJ) leased the terminal for 38 years. The PANYNJ took full ownership of Howland Hook Marine Terminal in 2024. The PANYNJ currently contracts CMA CGM to operate a container terminal on the site.

The facility is 187 acres (76 ha) in size, but there have been plans for expansion with the acquisition in 2001 of the adjacent 124-acre (50 ha) Port Ivory, a former shipping port operated by Procter & Gamble.

The terminal operates a 3,012 feet (918 m) long wharf on the Arthur Kill, with three berths for container ships. The wharf depth is 50 feet (15.24 meters) for 1,200 feet (365.76 meters); 41 feet (12.50 meters) for 1,100 feet (335.28 meters); and 35 feet (10.67 meters) for 700 feet (213.36 meters). A fourth 1,340 feet (410 m) long berth with 50 feet (15.24 m) depth is planned on the old Port Ivory site. Facilities include container storage, a deep-freeze refrigerated warehouse and United States Customs Service inspection.

The facility is also used to transfer containerized municipal waste from barges to trains, handling roughly half of New York City's barged trash volume.

The terminal includes an on-site seven-track ExpressRail intermodal facility that connects via the Arthur Kill Vertical Lift Bridge to New Jersey and the national rail network. Two tracks are used for transferring waste containers. The rail facility opened in mid-2007 and uses part of the once-abandoned North Shore Branch of the Staten Island Railway, which leads into the Arlington Yard, and the Travis branch, along the West Shore.

== See also ==
- Port Jersey Marine Terminal
- Port Newark-Elizabeth Marine Terminal
- Red Hook Marine Terminal
- Geography of New York-New Jersey Harbor Estuary
