= Port Reading Railroad =

Former railway company in New Jersey

- 1923 map

Overview
- Dates of operation: 1890–1976
- Successor: Conrail

The Port Reading Railroad was a railway company in the United States. It was incorporated in 1890 and completed its main line in 1892. It was controlled throughout its corporate life by the Reading Company. The Port Reading Railroad's line was conveyed to Conrail in 1976, and is today the Port Reading Secondary.

== Origins ==
The Port Reading Railroad started at the Port Reading Junction in Manville, New Jersey (near Bound Brook) with the Lehigh Valley Railroad and Central Railroad of New Jersey and headed eastward across northern Middlesex County, New Jersey to a terminus port called Port Reading, which was situated on the Arthur Kill in Woodbridge Township near Perth Amboy, New Jersey. Port Reading was constructed specifically to serve the needs of the Philadelphia and Reading Railway.

Via the Port Reading Railroad and the affiliated Port Reading shipping terminal (which was also built by the Philadelphia and Reading Railway) along the Arthur Kill waterway, trains from the Reading Co's Trenton line (originally the Delaware and Bound Brook Railroad) were capable of providing through service to/from the New York ports to points south and west, via a connection along the Raritan River from Manville, New Jersey to Bound Brook that was built between the Philadelphia and Reading Railway's Trenton line and the newly built Port Reading Railroad. Remnants of this connection, such as decaying trestles and track, can still be seen along the CSX/NS mainline through this area. The structures closest to the river are the former Reading Co. connection.

== 20th-century decline ==
The Port Reading Railroad and its parent the Philadelphia and Reading Railway, as was the case for many American railroads of the time period, saw a general drop off in business as the 20th Century progressed, and the railroads fell into disrepair and eventually went bankrupt. Secondary lines such as the Port Reading Railroad were hit especially hard during this period of decline, as the parent railroads neglected their branch lines as business declined.

By the time Conrail took over most railroading in the northeastern United States in 1976, the renamed Port Reading Secondary (terminology used by Conrail to describe branch lines) was little more than a seldom used line that serviced local industries. This status continued throughout the 1980s and into the 1990s as Conrail saw little need for the redundant Port Reading Secondary beyond providing local freight services (Conrail used the Lehigh Line for most traffic into the New York area from the south).

== Conrail Shared Assets Operations ownership ==
In 1999, CSX and Norfolk Southern split Conrail, but because of the Port Reading Secondary's proximity to the New York City consumer market, they could not decide how to split it, so, they took most of the lines near NYC and they created a separate company, Conrail Shared Assets Operations. It is jointly owned by the two railroads, to switch cars in the NYC area. (The same thing happened in the Philadelphia area and the Detroit area). In contrast to earlier decades, the 1990s was a decade in which railroads started to see some incremental increases in freight traffic as increases in freight demand and congested highways caused more shippers to move their freight via rail. To respond to the challenge of serving the increased demands of the New York/New Jersey region, CSAO invested millions of dollars to upgrade the Port Reading Secondary to handle long distance trains, including intermodal trains taking an alternate route to their terminals along the Chemical Coast Line, such as NS's E-Rail Terminal and the PANYNJ owned ExpressRail terminals.

The Port Reading Secondary now offers an additional route to CSAO's rail facilities in the Port of New York and New Jersey, via the Chemical Coast line that runs along heavily industrialized eastern New Jersey, near the Arthur Kill waterway that separates New Jersey from Staten Island, New York. Rail traffic has increased substantially on the Port Reading Secondary in recent years as a result of the upgrades. Railroad signals currently exist at the crossing on Homestead Avenue in Avenel, but not at Omar Avenue in Avenel, where such signals would interfere with exiting trucks. Also, Carteret has signals at the crossing by the NJ Turnpike entrance. Also, Port Reading Conrail has signal gates at Blair Road, Rahway Avenue and Saint Georges Avenue in Woodbridge Township.
