= Port Reading Secondary =

Overview
- Owner: Conrail Shared Assets Operations

History
- Opened: September 1892

Technical
- Line length: 16.0 mi (25.7 km)
- Track gauge: 1,435 mm (4 ft 8 1/2 in) standard gauge
- Operating speed: 30 miles per hour (48 km/h)

The Port Reading Secondary, also known as the Port Reading Branch, is a railway line in New Jersey. It runs 16.0 miles (25.7 km) from a junction with the Lehigh Line in Bound Brook, New Jersey, to Port Reading, New Jersey, on the Arthur Kill. Originally built by the Port Reading Railroad and part of the Reading Company system, today the line belongs to Conrail Shared Assets Operations (CSAO).

== Route ==
The line diverges from the Lehigh Line (formerly the main line of the Lehigh Valley Railroad) at CP Bound Brook in Bound Brook, New Jersey. From there it proceeds east to Port Reading, New Jersey, on the Arthur Kill. The line connects with the Chemical Coast Secondary in Port Reading, just short of the yard there.

== History ==
The Port Reading Railroad was founded in 1890 by the Philadelphia and Reading Railroad to build a line east from the existing New York Branch to a point on the Atlantic coast, where it would establish a new port. The line, 19.645 miles (31.616 km) long, opened in September 1892. The western end connected with the New York Branch at Port Reading Junction in Manville, New Jersey, on the west side of the Raritan River.

The Philadelphia and Reading, and later the Reading Company, controlled the Port Reading Railroad and the company was never merged into the corporate parent. On the Reading's final bankruptcy in 1976 the line was conveyed to Conrail. Conrail rationalized the trackage around Bound Brook, making a new connection between the former Lehigh Valley main line and the Port Reading line near Bound Brook station, and abandoning the line west of there. When Conrail was split between CSX and the Norfolk Southern Railway in 1999, the Port Reading Secondary remained with Conrail as part of Conrail Shared Assets Operations.
