= Roselle Park station =

NJ Transit rail station

Roselle Park
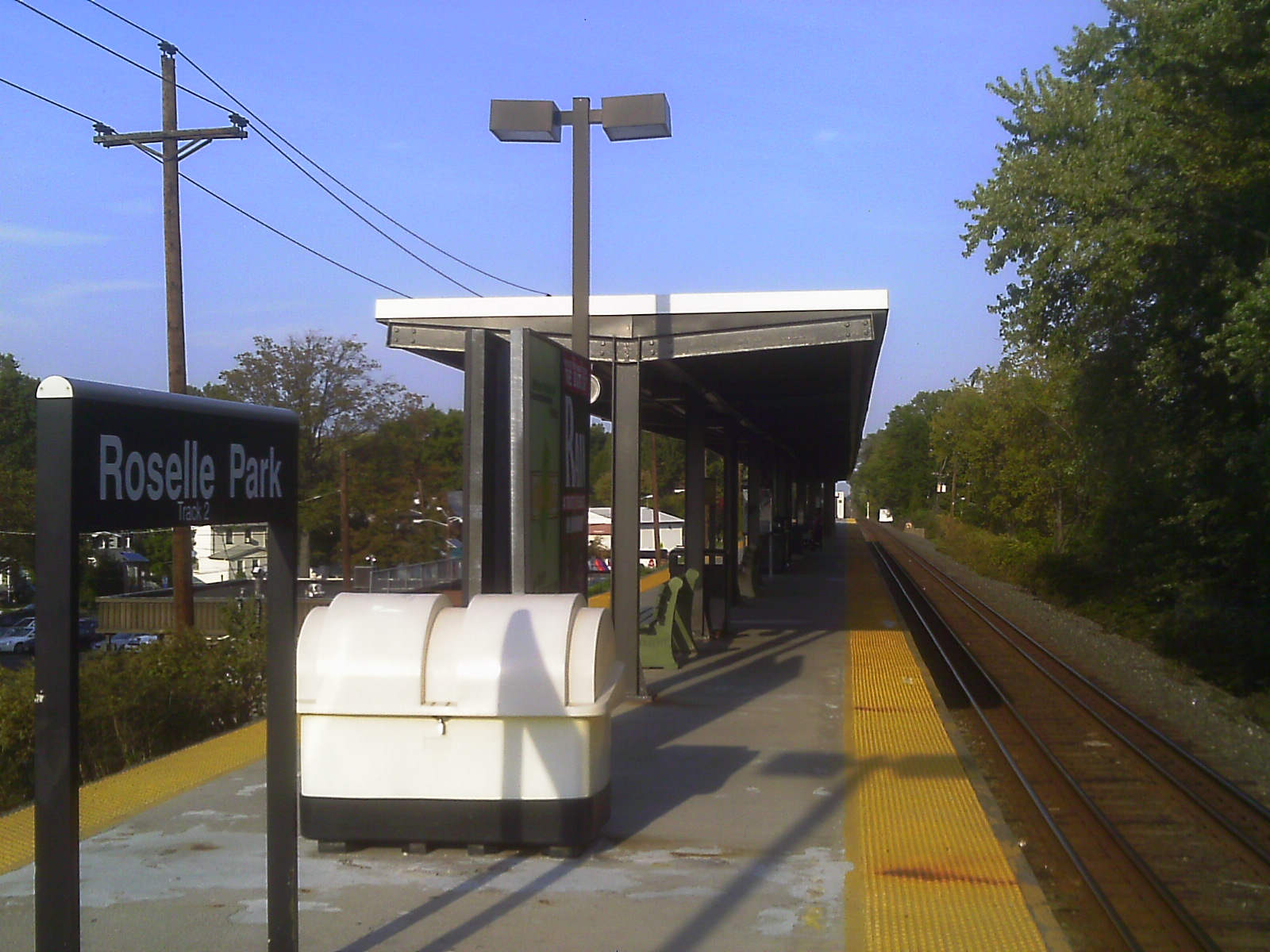
- The Roselle Park station platform

General information
- Location: West Lincoln Avenue and Donald Place, Roselle Park, New Jersey, U.S.
- Coordinates: 40.6672°N 74.2666°W
- Line: Lehigh Line
- Distance: 17.2 miles (27.7 km) from New York Penn Station
- Platforms: 1 island platform
- Tracks: 2
- Connections: NJ Transit Bus: 94, 113

Construction
- Parking: 192 spaces (190 standard, 2 accessible)
- Accessible: No

Other information
- Fare zone: 6

History
- Opened: February 3, 1891
- Closed: February 3, 1961
- Rebuilt: April 30, 1967

Passengers
- 2025: 648 (average weekday)
- Rank: 45 of 153

Services
Preceding station	NJ Transit	Following station
Cranford toward High Bridge	Raritan Valley Line	Union toward Newark Penn or New York
Former services
Preceding station	Lehigh Valley Railroad	Following station
Flemington Junction toward Buffalo	Main Line	Townley toward New York or Jersey City
Aldene toward Buffalo	Main Line	Townley toward New York or Jersey City
Location

Roselle Park station is an active commuter railroad station in the borough of Roselle Park, Union County, New Jersey. Located at the intersection of West Lincoln Avenue and Donald Place, along with an auxiliary access from Locust Street (County Route 619), the station services trains of NJ Transit's Raritan Valley Line. Trains through Roselle Park station go between High Bridge in Hunterdon County and Newark Penn Station. Some trains continue east to New York Penn Station. Roselle Park station consists of a single high-level island platform, which serves two local tracks. Freight service operated by Conrail Shared Assets Operations (CSAO) and its joint owners, CSX Transportation and Norfolk Southern Railway pass through the station.

Service to Roselle Park station began on February 3, 1891 with the opening of the Newark and Roselle Railway, which would be acquired by the Lehigh Valley Railroad to run operations to Jersey City, New Jersey. Passenger service ended exactly 70 years later, on February 3, 1961. As part of the Aldene Plan, which rerouted main line service off the Central Railroad of New Jersey east of Cranford to Newark Penn Station, Roselle Park station was re-opened on an elevated right-of-way on April 30, 1967.

== History ==
The station is located at milepost 16.0 on the Conrail Lehigh Line, part of the former Lehigh Valley Railroad main line, built by LV subsidiary Newark and Roselle Railway. The second station to stand on the property, it was built in 1967 during the construction of the Aldene Plan. The Aldene Plan was a joint project between the railroads, New Jersey Department of Transportation, and The Port Authority of New York and New Jersey which elevated trackage above ground level to eliminate grade crossings and rerouted Central Railroad of New Jersey trains, one of NJ Transit's predecessor railroads, from its aging Jersey City terminal to Pennsylvania Station in Newark.

== Station layout and service ==
The station has one high-level island platform serving two tracks. The platform is 834 feet (254 m) long and accommodates nine cars. There is no elevator connecting the platform with the entrance. Like Union station, Roselle Park has gauntlet tracks (a slightly shifted-over track) on both sides that allow freight trains to pass the high level platform safely.
