= Gauntlet track =

Overlap configuration to narrow track formation

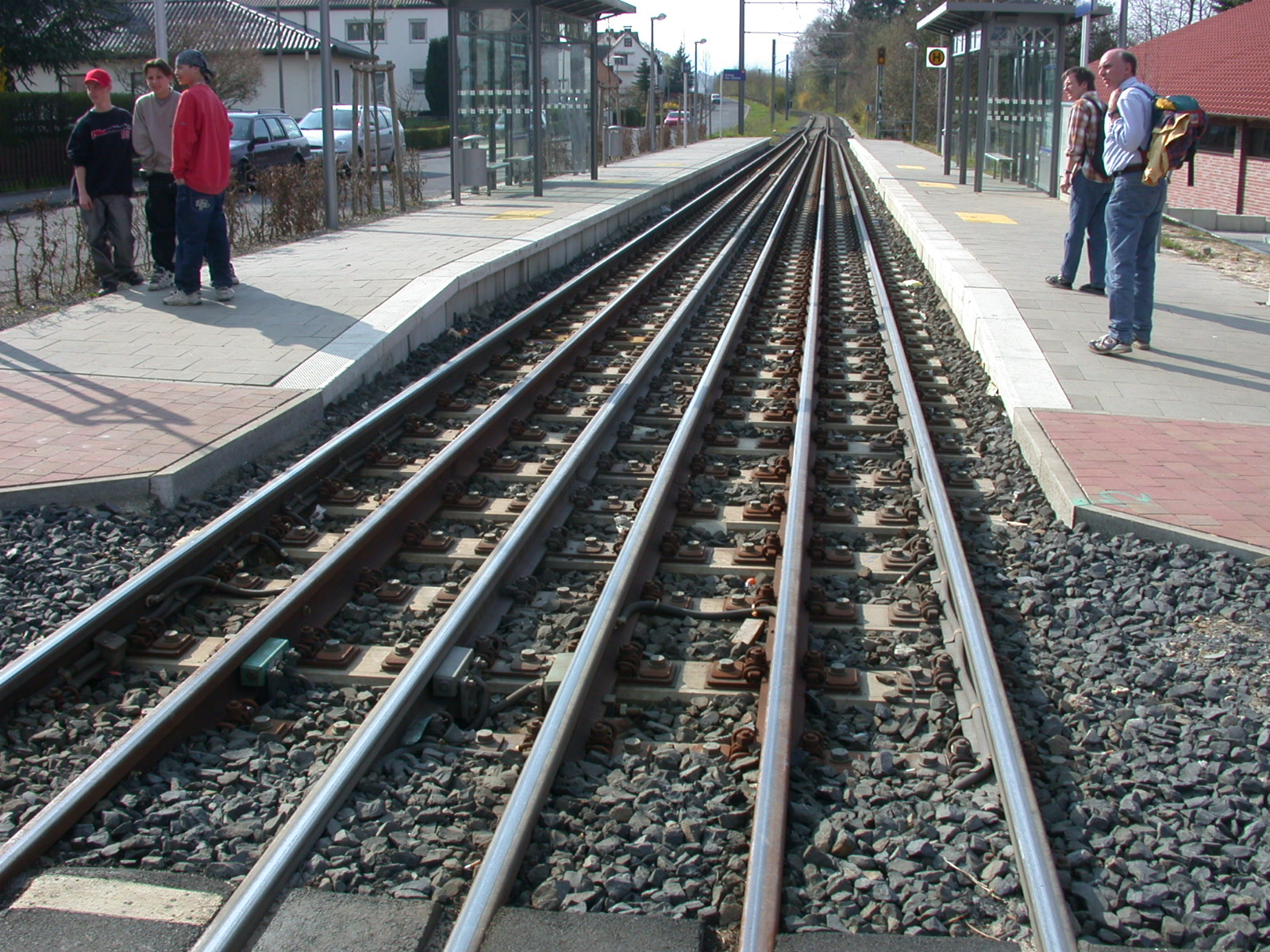
Triple gauntlet track at Kaufungen, Germany. Wider mainline trains go down the centre; narrower trams switch either to the left, or right, to be closer to the appropriate platform. Beyond the station, the rails return to single track.

Gauntlet track, also called interlaced track or gantlet track (AE) is an arrangement in which railway tracks run parallel on a single track bed and are interlaced (i.e., overlapped) in such a way that only one pair of rails can be used at any time. Since this requires only slightly more width than a single track, all rails can be carried on the same crossties/sleepers. Trains run on the pair of rails appropriate to their direction, track gauge or loading gauge.

The term gauntlet refers to the expression running the gauntlet, which means running between two confining rows of adversaries.

== Configurations ==
=== Frog gauntlet (double-gauntlet-double) ===
Gauntlet tracks can be used to provide horizontal clearance to a fixed obstruction adjacent to a track such as a cutting, bridge, or tunnel. Frog gauntlets are also commonly used when a rail line's capacity is increased by the provision of an additional track, but cost or other factors prevent the widening of the bridges. They are typically used for short stretches of track where it is cheaper to provide extra rails than to provide switches and reduce the line to single track. This also eliminates the problem of switch/point failures.

In a frog gauntlet, one rail crosses over a rail on the adjacent track. A frog is used to provide the flangeway for the crossing tracks. The train taking the gauntlet runs over the frog onto the parallel rails, passes through the gauntlet area, and passes over another frog to return to the original line. Since there are no points or other moving parts on a frog gauntlet track, a train operating on one of the tracks cannot be routed onto the other. Because two trains cannot use the gauntlet at the same time, scheduling and signalling must allow for this restriction. A type of frog gauntlet is common in funicular railways, with gauntlet track along the entire route except for a short doubled section halfway up. Frogs eliminate the need for moving points (which require regular maintenance and can break down) and because both trains are connected by a fixed length of cable there is no risk of a collision occurring as long as a passing loop is provided at the halfway point.

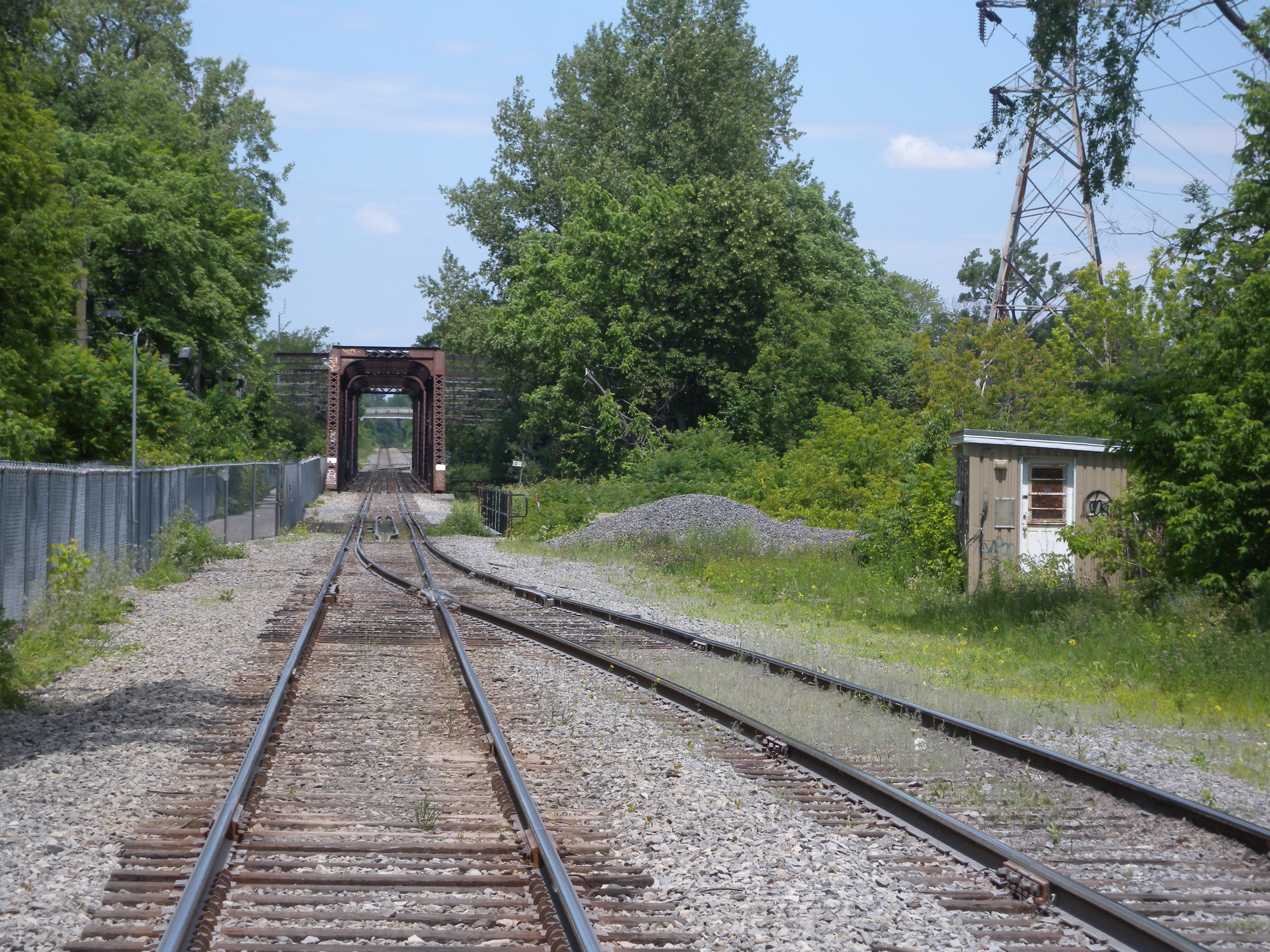
Gauntlet track on the approach to the Bordeaux Railway Bridge from Montreal to Laval, Quebec

Where two tracks converge into gauntlet track, they overlap rather than connect.

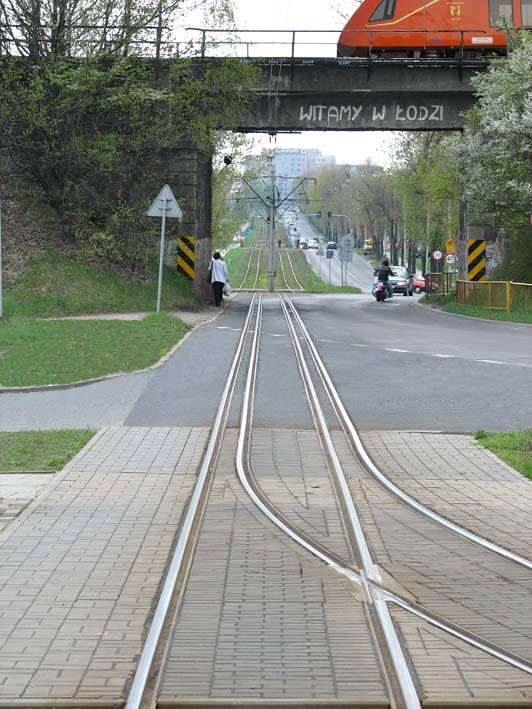
Gauntlet track, Łódź Warszawska interlacing, in a narrow road under the tram overpass

=== Point gauntlet/interlaced loop (single-gauntlet-single) ===
In a point gauntlet track, the rails for the two tracks do not need to cross, so no frog is required. The train taking the gauntlet runs over a set of switch points onto the parallel rails, passes through the gauntlet area, and passes over another set of switch points to return to the original line. This arrangement is used at the Roselle Park station referenced below.

Gauntlet tracks are also often used at weigh scales so that locomotives can bypass the equipment to avoid accidental damage.

At a small number of locations on single track lines in Britain, interlaced loops had been provided where sprung catch points were required because of the steep gradient. The points at either end of the loop were set according to the train's direction of travel. Trains running uphill were routed via the loop incorporating the sprung catch point. Trains running downhill used the opposite loop, bypassing the catch point.

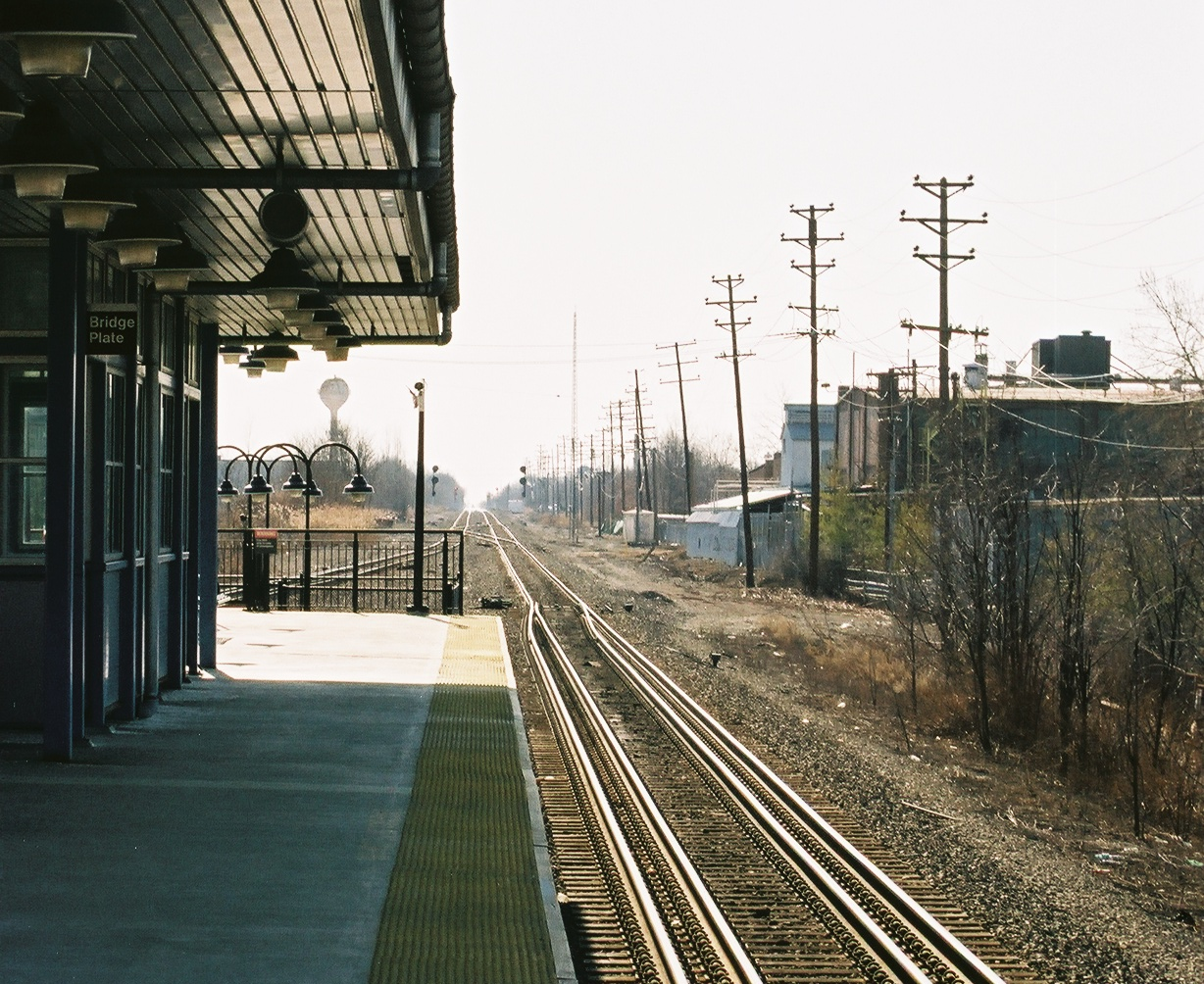
Gauntlet track on Conrail Shared Assets Operation Lehigh Line at New Jersey Transit's Raritan Valley Line Union Station

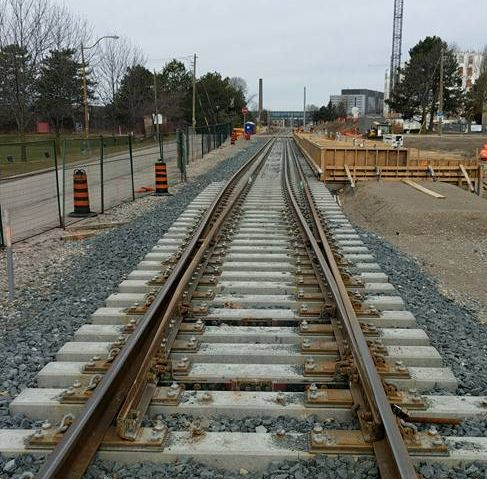
Ion rapid transit gauntlet track

=== Single-gauntlet-double ===
Where routes diverge, but it is not practical to locate the physical switch apparatus at the point of divergence (especially on trams, where roads may be in the way), a section of gauntlet track may be provided between where the routes actually diverge and the location of the physical switch.

=== Dual-gauge track ===
An arrangement similar to gauntlet track is sometimes used to allow trains of different gauges to use the same track. In that case, the two interlaced tracks will have different gauges, sometimes sharing one of the rails for a total of three rails when the difference between the track gauges is large enough.

== Examples ==
=== Australia ===
In Melbourne, broad (1600 mm) and standard dual gauge gauntlet track is located within the passenger yard of Southern Cross station, and in platforms 1 and 2. Those tracks also run on the Regional Rail Link flyover towards South Dynon yards. The northern section of the Upfield line, between the Ford sidings and Somerton, is also dual gauge gauntlet track. On the Western standard gauge line from Melbourne towards Adelaide, dual gauge track can be found between the Geelong Harbour and Gheringhap, as well as along the Newport-Sunshine freight line in Melbourne. In Brisbane, standard and narrow (1067 mm) dual gauge gauntlet track is located on platform 2 of Roma Street station.

=== Belgium/Germany ===
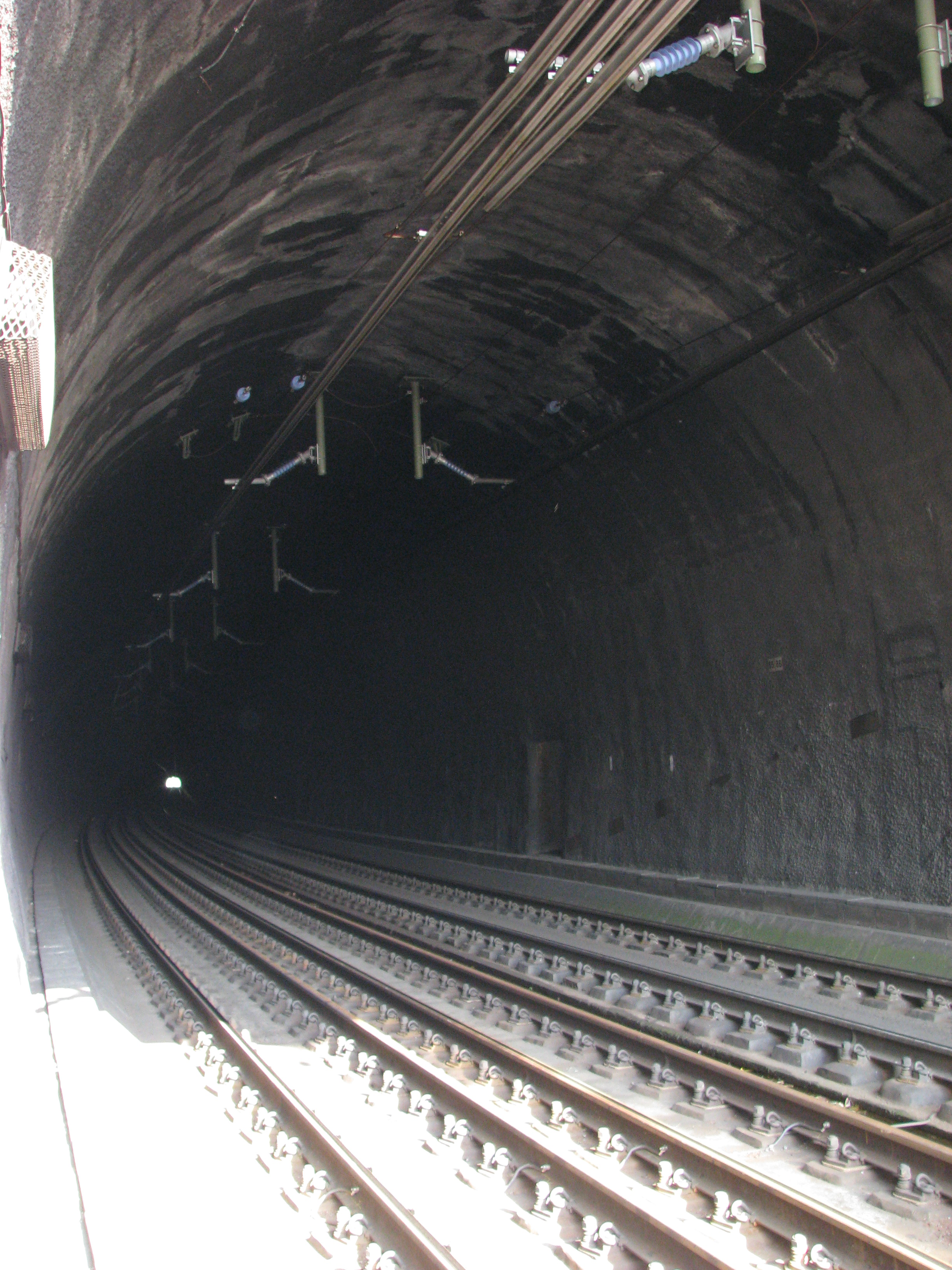
Gemmenich Tunnel and the route taken by wide loads passing through it

The Gemmenich Tunnel (German: Gemmenicher Tunnel, French: Tunnel de Botzelaer) passing under the Dreiländerpunkt (Three country point) has a special track layout to enable the passage of wide military loads. The double-track tunnel has a third set of rails interlaced with one of the normal tracks. Active points (switches) at each end of the tunnel allow a train to divert along the central track, whilst other trains are blocked by signalling. The third track is rarely in use, so there is no limitation of capacity through the tunnel for standard-sized trains.

Close to where the borders of Belgium, Germany and the Netherlands come together, the interlaced tunnel section provides an important connection between Germany and the Belgian harbour at Antwerp. After completing the installation in 1991, trains with an oversize loading gauge were rerouted over this line, and the lightly used (but tunnel-free) secondary line between Stolberg and Welkenraedt (crossing the border at Raeren) was closed to freight traffic. Electric-hauled trains requiring use of the central track will get their power from the right track's (in travelling direction Germany to Belgium) overhead rail, which to that purpose is slightly further off-centre than normal.

=== Canada ===
Gauntlet track exists on the Perry Island Bordeaux Railway Bridge across the Rivière des Prairies between Montreal and Laval (Parc subdivision, mile 10.0) because the structure gauge is not sufficiently wide for double track. This bridge is used by freight trains of Canadian Pacific Kansas City, the Quebec Gatineau Railway and by the Saint-Jérôme line suburban trains of the Réseau de transport métropolitain (Exo).

The Toronto streetcar system includes a very short section of gauntlet track on Queen Street East, at Coxwell Avenue. A loop allowing southbound cars to return northbound on Coxwell Avenue briefly interlaces with the westbound track on Queen Street, due to turning radius limitations. A switch partially within the gauntlet section allows westbound streetcars from Queen Street to transition to the loop curve, and turn right onto Coxwell Avenue, but streetcars already within the loop cannot switch to the westbound Queen Street track.

=== Finland ===
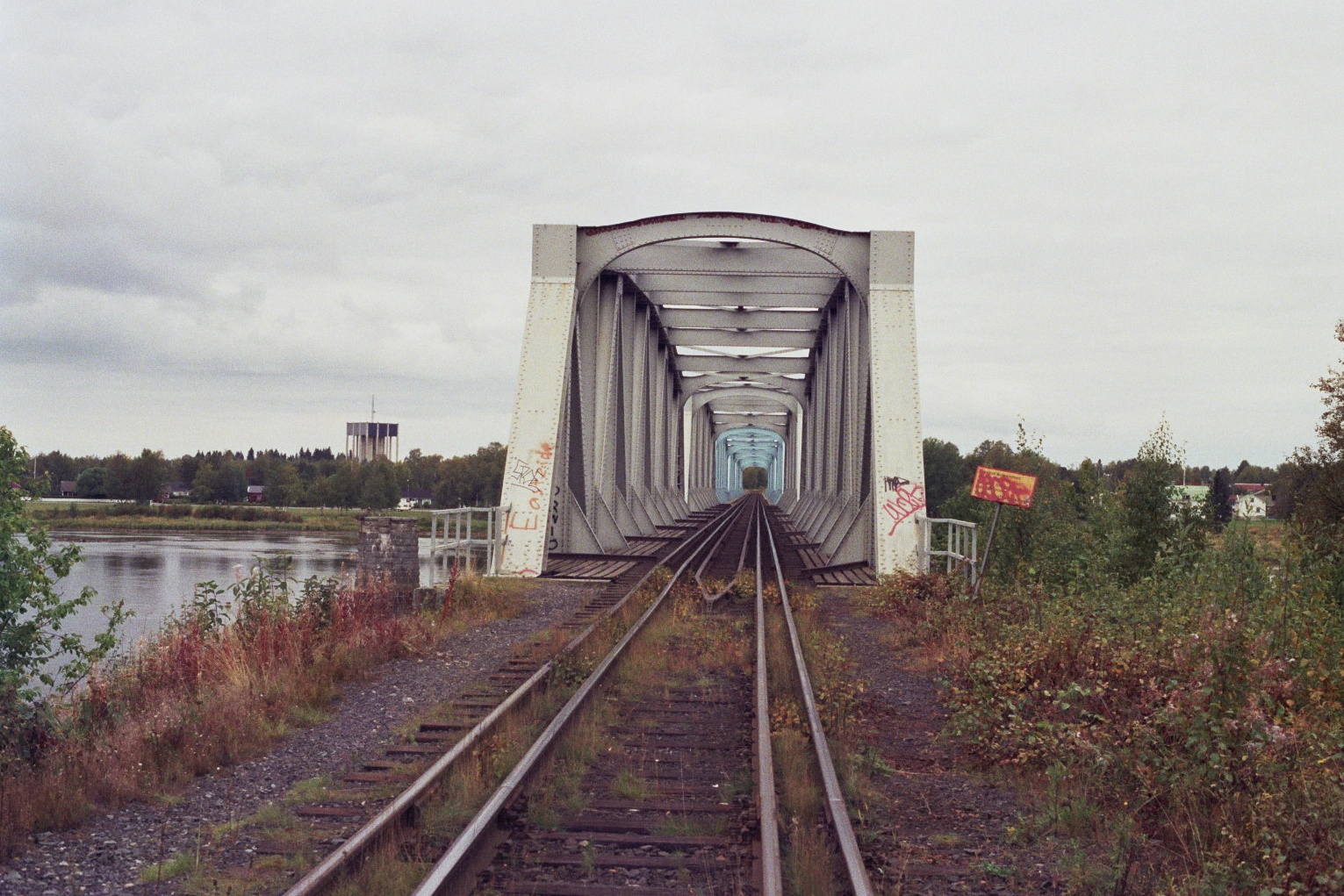
The Torne River Railway Bridge between Sweden and Finland, with guard rails between dual gauge gauntlet track

At the border with Sweden where the Torne separates the cities of Tornio, Finland and Haparanda, Sweden, a two-kilometre section of dual gauge track uses a gauntlet configuration because the 1,524 mm (5 ft) gauge used in Finland and 1,435 mm (4 ft 8 1/2 in) standard gauge used in Sweden are too close for a common rail to be shared. The link, which opened in 1919 with the completion of the Torne River Railway Bridge, is complemented by a marshalling yard at each end, an arrangement that allows trains from either country to stop in the other for freight to be transferred to trains of the local gauge.

=== Russia ===
The Moscow tramway network has only one stretch of gauntlet track remaining in place. The five-track railway line just south of Kursky Terminal is crossed through a narrow tunnel built at the beginning of the 20th century and unsuitable for a two-track tram line. Other similar stretches were removed or re-organised, since according to the standards, gauntlet tracks on tram lines are only permitted as a temporary measure. Similar arrangements exist on the approach to Kaliningrad, where 1435 mm (4 ft 8 1/2 in) track extends from the Polish border with some sections of dual gauge.

=== United States ===
The San Francisco cable car system features three areas with gauntlet tracks where the outer rail of the inner track is shared as the inner rail of the outer track for two sections of tracks: on Washington Street between Mason Street and Powell Street, on Powell Street (north of Washington Street) onto Jackson Street to the point of divergence of the Powell Street lines at Jackson Street and Mason Street, and on Hyde Street between Jackson Street and Washington Street.

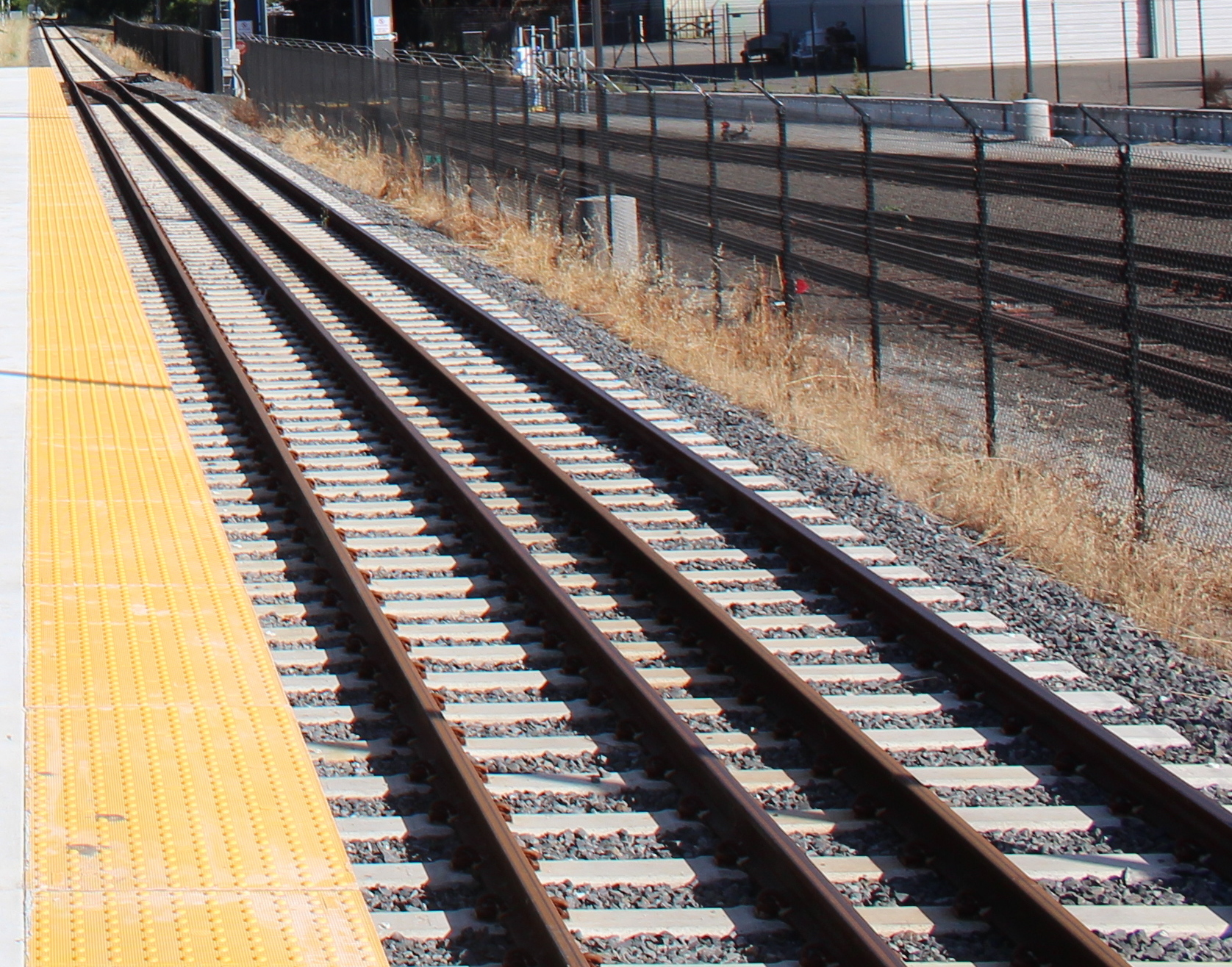
Gauntlet at Sonoma County Airport station

Sonoma–Marin Area Rail Transit uses gauntlet tracks at several stations. The pair of rails closer to the platform provides level boarding with the high-floor passenger trains, while the pair of rails farther away gives freight trains sufficient clearance to pass the platform.

The Atchison, Topeka and Santa Fe Railway utilized gauntlet track on large bridges in Arizona and Missouri, these being the second bridge spanning Canyon Diablo, the Red Rock Bridge at Topock, the crossing of the Colorado River, and the bridge spanning the Missouri River at Sibley, Missouri. These were all modifications done during the double-tracking of the railroad between 1912 and 1923. This was done to fit the second track in the space of the single-track bridge without the need of switches on either side of the bridge, and avoided the cost of building entirely new bridges, at least for a time. The Topock and Canyon Diablo bridges were replaced in 1944 and 1947 respectively with full-width double-tracked spans.

Although a monorail cannot strictly speaking have gauntlet track, the nearest equivalent would be when two parallel monorail tracks are too close together to allow two trains to pass. This happens at the southern terminus of the Seattle Center Monorail at the Westlake Center in Downtown Seattle, Washington, where the station was rebuilt in 1988 with the dual tracks only about 4 feet (1.2 m) apart to allow for a narrower station, which led to a collision in 2005 that suspended monorail service for several months.

== See also ==
- Funicular
- Glossary of rail transport terms
- Railway platform
- Railway platform height
