= Union station (NJ Transit) =

NJ Transit rail station

Union
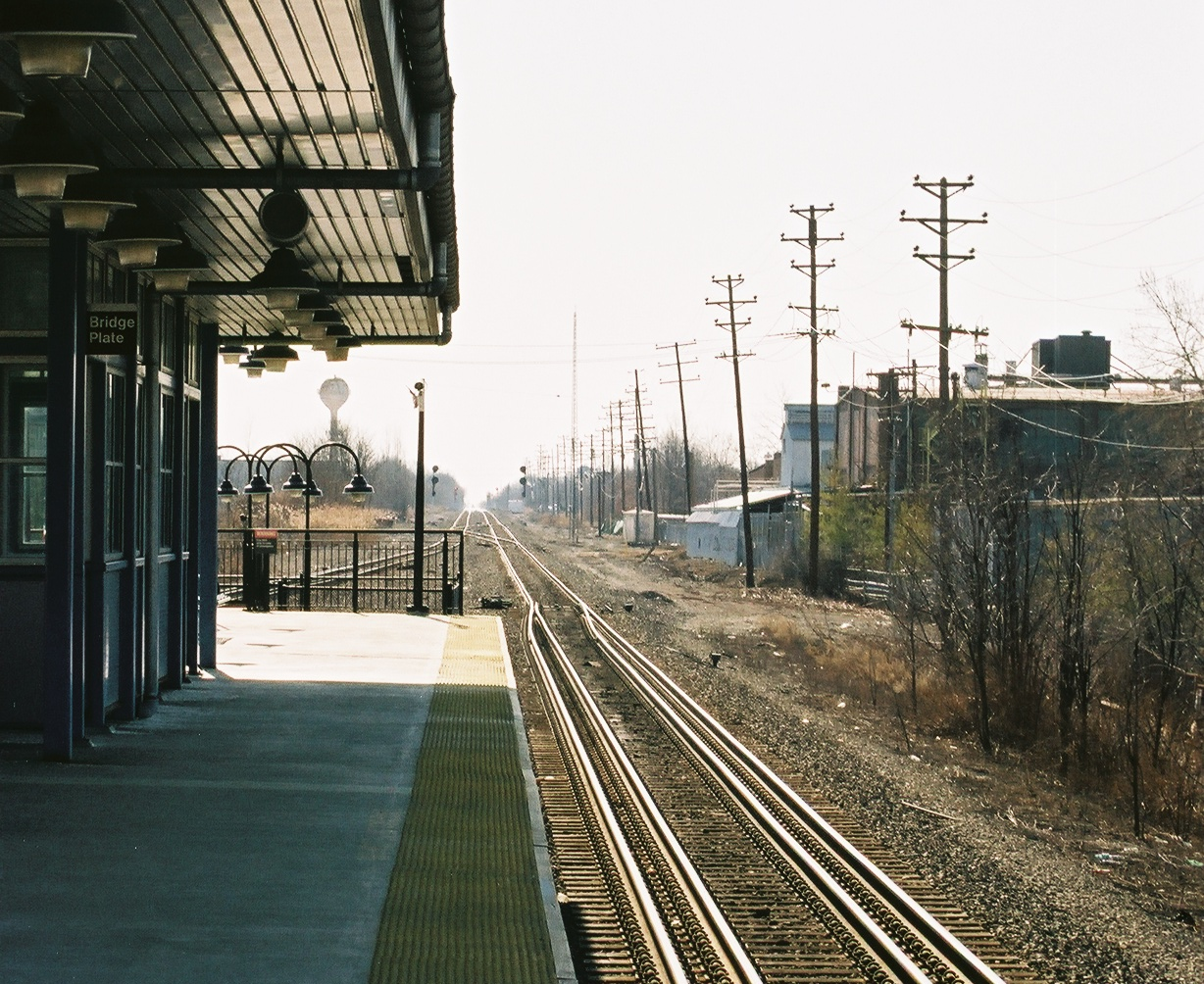
- Union station in March 2010

General information
- Location: Green Lane and Morris Avenue (NJ 82), Union, New Jersey
- Coordinates: 40°41′0″N 74°14′19″W
- Owner: NJ Transit (station), Conrail Shared Assets Operations (track)
- Line: Lehigh Line
- Distance: 15.3 miles (24.6 km) from New York Penn Station
- Platforms: 1 island platform
- Tracks: 2
- Connections: NJ Transit Bus: 26, 52

Construction
- Parking: 422 spaces (412 standard, 10 accessible)
- Cycle facilities: Yes
- Accessible: Yes

Other information
- Fare zone: 5

History
- Opened: April 28, 2003

Passengers
- 2025: 1128 (average weekday)
- Rank: 29 of 153

Services
Preceding station	NJ Transit	Following station
Roselle Park toward High Bridge	Raritan Valley Line	Newark Penn Terminus
Roselle Park toward High Bridge	Raritan Valley Line	Newark Penn toward New York
Former services
Preceding station	Lehigh Valley Railroad	Following station
Roselle Park toward Buffalo	Main Line (Townley station)	Newark Market Street toward New York or Jersey City
Roselle Park toward Buffalo	Main Line (Townley station)	Hillside toward New York or Jersey City
Location

Union station is an active commuter railroad station in the eponymous Union Township, Union County, New Jersey. Located on Green Lane off Morris Avenue (State Route 82) near the campus of Kean University, the station serves trains of NJ Transit's Raritan Valley Line between High Bridge and Newark Penn Station. Occasional trains continue east to New York Penn Station. Freight service operated by Conrail Shared Assets Operations (CSAO), CSX Transportation and Norfolk Southern Railway bypass the station. Union station consists of a single high-level island platform that separates the two tracks. The station is dedicated in honor of the late Congressman Bob Franks.

Railroad service through Union Township began with the opening of the Newark and Roselle Railway in 1891. In the area of the current station, the railroad operated the Townley station. Passenger service operated by the Lehigh Valley Railroad until 1961. The Aldene Plan realigned service back onto the line, but no station was opened on the property until April 28, 2003.

== History ==
The Lehigh Valley Railroad, through its subsidiary the Newark and Roselle Railway, opened a line between Roselle and Newark in 1891. Serving Union Township was Townley station, 0.5 miles (0.80 km) east of the current station site. Townley was one of several stations that closed after the Lehigh Valley Railroad ended its commuter service in 1948. All passenger service on the Lehigh Valley Railroad ended in 1961.

Passenger service over the Lehigh Valley Railroad returned in 1967 with the Aldene Plan. A joint project between the Lehigh Valley Railroad, the Central Railroad of New Jersey, the New Jersey Department of Transportation, and the Port Authority of New York and New Jersey, the plan re-routed Jersey Central passenger trains over the Lehigh Valley between Roselle and Pennsylvania Station in Newark. One new station was built at the time: Roselle Park.

Planning for an infill station in Union Township began in the 1990s as part of the redevelopment of Morris Avenue. The new station was also called "Townley" during planning before Union was adopted in 1998. The new station opened April 28, 2003, at a cost of $27 million. It is adjacent to Kean University. Station amenities include a waiting room, rest rooms, vendors, and a 464-space parking lot. The station features artwork reproducing the 40th parallel of the Earth's northern hemisphere, and shows cities through which the 40th parallel runs including Lisbon, Rome, and Beijing. Currently, the station is served by 53 weekday and 36 weekend NJ Transit trains.

=== Dedication ===
On September 24, 2013, the station was dedicated to Congressman Bob Franks.

== Station layout and service ==
The station has one high-level island platform serving two tracks. The platform is 546 feet (166 m) long and can accommodate six cars. The station has gauntlet tracks (a slightly shifted-over track) on both sides that allow freight trains to pass the high level platform safely. Currently, freight trains past the station are operated by Conrail, CSX Transportation and Norfolk Southern Railway.
