= Railway platform height =

Vertical distance between top of the platform and top of the rail

The Yawkey MBTA Commuter Rail station in 2011, with two platform heights: low-level for most cars and a full-height platform to accommodate passengers in wheelchairs.

Railway platform height is the built height – above top of rail (ATR) – of passenger platforms at stations. A connected term is train floor height, which refers to the ATR height of the floor of rail vehicles. Worldwide, there are many, frequently incompatible, standards for platform heights and train floor heights. Where raised platforms are in use, train widths must also be compatible, in order to avoid both large gaps between platforms and trains and mechanical interference liable to cause equipment damage.

Differences in platform height (and platform gap) can pose a risk for passenger safety. Differences between platform height and train floor height may also make boarding much more difficult, or impossible, for wheelchair-using passengers and people with other mobility impairments, increasing station dwell time as platform or staff are required to deploy ramps to assist boarding. Platform ramps, steps, and platform gap fillers together with hazard warnings such as "mind the gap" are used to reduce risk and facilitate access. Platform height affects the loading gauge (the maximum size of train cars), and must conform to the structure gauge physical clearance specifications for the system. Tracks which are shared between freight and passenger service must have platforms which do not obstruct either type of railroad car.

To reduce construction costs, the platforms at stations on many railway systems are of low height, making it necessary for passenger cars to be equipped with external steps or internal stairs allowing passengers access to and from car floor levels. When railways were first introduced in the 19th century, low platforms were widely used from the 1880s, especially in rural areas, except in the United Kingdom. Over the years, raised platforms have become far more widespread, and are almost universal for high-speed express routes and universal in cities on commuter and rapid transit lines. Raised platforms on narrow gauge railways can prevent track gauge conversion to standard gauge or broad gauge.

== Height categories ==
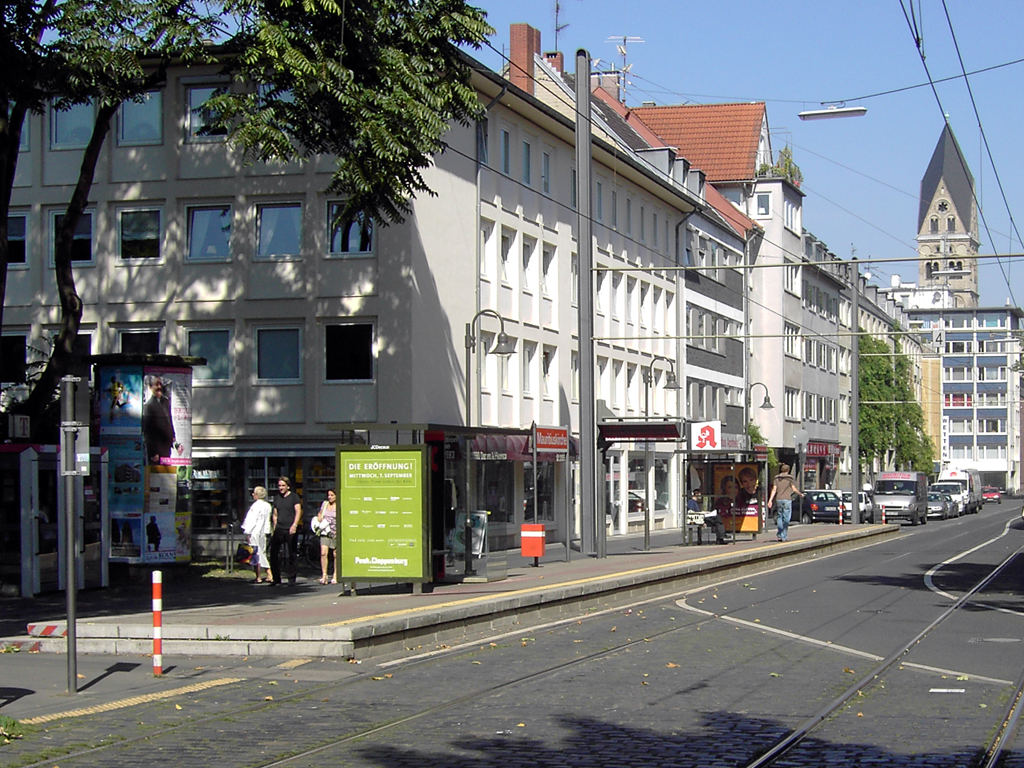
A low floor tram platform in Cologne, 2005

Buses, trams, trolleys, and railway passenger cars are divided into several typical categories.

- Ultra Low Floor tram – 180 mm (7 in)
- Low floor tram – 300 to 350 mm (12 to 14 in)
- High floor tram – more than 600 mm (23 1/2 in)
- Low floor train – 550 mm (21 1/2 in)
- Train (in UK or narrow gauge) – 800 to 1,200 mm (31 1/2 to 47 in)
- Train (standard gauge (except UK) or broad gauge) – 1,300 to 1,370 mm (51 to 54 in)

These are floor heights. The platforms can be much lower, overcome by onboard staircases.

== Africa ==
=== Algeria ===
Typical Algerian platforms are 550 mm (21 1/2 in) above rail.

=== Kenya ===
The 1,435 mm (4 ft 8 1/2 in) SGR platforms are two standard heights of 300 mm (12 in) and 1,250 mm (49 in) above rail heads. The 1,000 mm (3 ft 3 3/8 in) meter gauge platforms are 1,100 mm (43 1/2 in).

== Asia ==
=== China ===
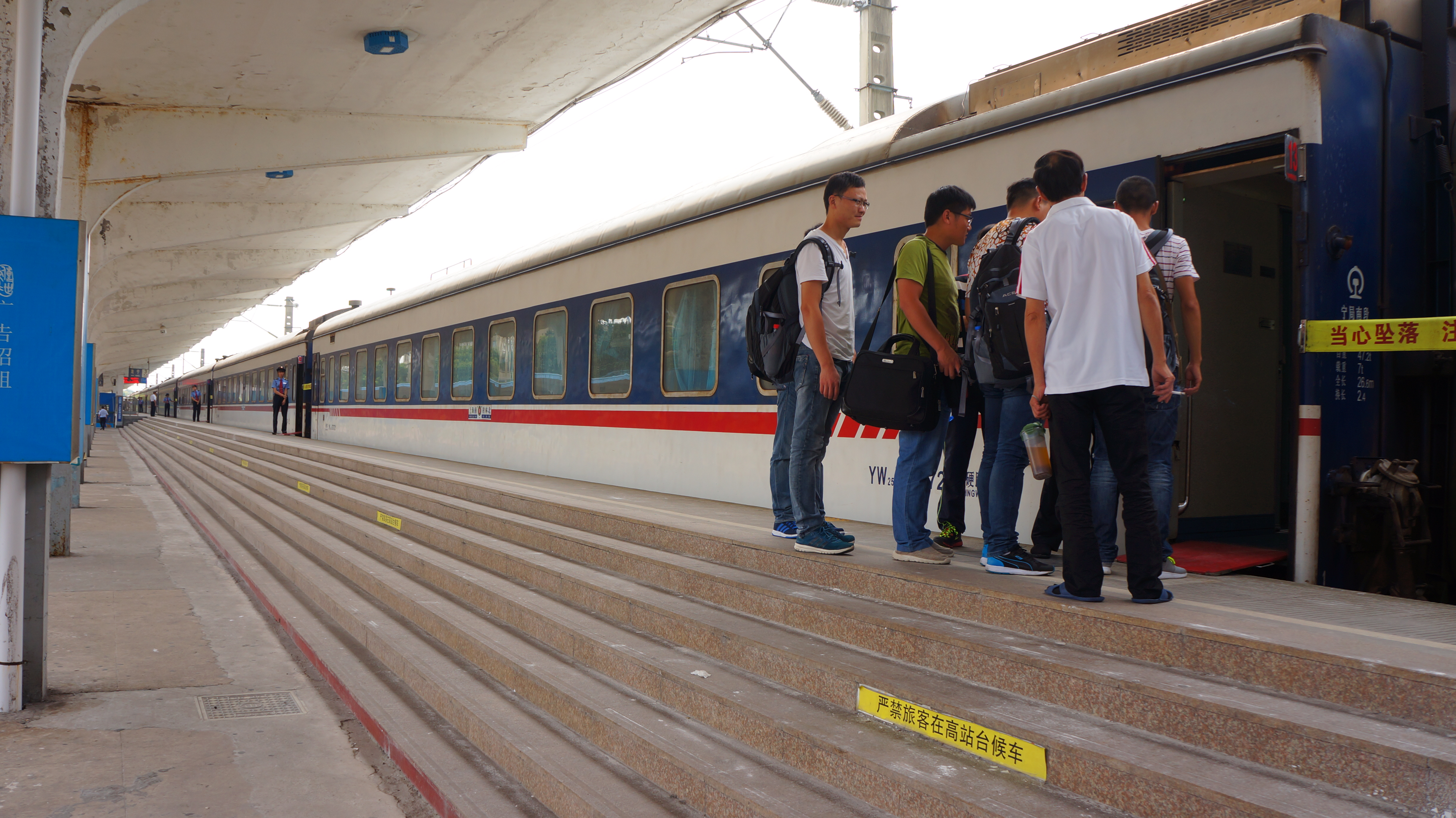
Haining railway station's platform includes both low and high platforms

China Railway platforms are classified into the categories of "low" 380 mm (15 in), "medium" 550 mm (21 1/2 in), "high" 760 mm (30 in) and "ultra high" 1,250 mm (49 in) (the latter two for most new and rebuilt platforms). Areas adjacent to broad gauge countries/regions, such as Xinjiang and Inner-Mongolia, are still equipped with low platforms. Under the concession period since late 2016, platforms on the southeastern corridor from Shenzhen to Ruili to be 1,250 mm (49 in) ATR, whereas the northern-, central-, and western-Chinese platforms to be 380 mm (15 in) ATR, are recommended.

Most CRH platforms are 1,250 millimetres (49 in) above top of rail, with the remainders being 760 millimetres (30 in).

The proposed 1,524 mm (5 ft) (Russian gauge) Rail North China (Note: The proposed 1,524 mm (5 ft) Russian gauge railways for northern China which will seamless link with Russia, Mongolia and Kazakhstan.) platforms will be 200 mm (8 in) above rails.

=== Hong Kong ===
Hong Kong's railway network consists of the local MTR network (including the former KCR), Hong Kong Tramways, and the Hong Kong section of the XRL high-speed line.

==== MTR network ====
Platforms on the MTR are 1,250 mm (49 in) above the rail for the Tung Chung line and Airport Express, collectively known as the Airport Railway lines.

The height of platforms on the Disneyland Resort line and the urban lines are 1,100 mm (43 1/2 in). The urban lines include the Tsuen Wan line, Kwun Tong line, Tseung Kwan O line, Island line, and South Island line.

==== Former KCR network ====
All platforms on the East Rail line and Tuen Ma line are 1,070 mm (42 in) above rail heads.

The light rail system uses a platform height of 910 mm (36 in) above rail level.

==== High-speed rail line ====
Trains at Hong Kong West Kowloon railway station travel along the XRL on China's high-speed rail system and so must be compliant with the platform height standard of 1,250 mm (49 in) above the rail.

=== India ===
The two standard platform heights are 200 mm (8 in) and 760 mm (30 in).

=== Indonesia ===
The three standard platform heights are 180 mm (7 in) (low), 430 mm (17 in) (medium), and 1,000 mm (39 1/2 in) (high) above rail head. Most railway stations in Indonesia use low platforms.

=== Iran ===
Iran's platforms are 380 mm (15 in), 550 mm (21 1/2 in) and 760 mm (30 in). Like in China, areas adjacent to broad gauge countries/regions such as the eastern regions such as around Mashhad and Zahedan, still equipped low platforms.

=== Israel ===
Israel Railways platforms fall in the range between 760 mm (30 in) to 1,060 mm (41 1/2 in) above top of rail.

=== Japan ===
The Japanese National Railways (JNR) for many years used a triple-standard for its conventional (Cape gauge) lines:

- 760 mm (30 in) for long-distance trains (originally step-fitted passenger cars pulled by steam engines);
- 1,100 mm (43 1/2 in) for commuter trains (step-less electric multiple units at a time when long-distance trains were not); and
- 920 mm (36 in) shared platforms that could serve both with relatively little discomfort (roughly level with the step on passenger carriages but not too low to board commuter trains).

However, increasing electrification and the phasing-out of locomotive traction in favor of multiple units has made the distinction a matter of historical, rather than practical relevance. Recently, at Japan Railways Group stations in urban centers such as Tokyo and Osaka, whose lines were the earliest to be electrified, 1,100 mm (43 1/2 in) is the norm and lower-level platforms are generally raised to this height during station improvements or refurbishment. Elsewhere, such as Hokkaido and the Tohoku/Hokuriku region of Honshu, 920 mm (36 in) – and even 760 mm (30 in) platforms are still commonplace. As this represents a potential obstacle when boarding modern commuter trains, workarounds such as a step built into the floor of area-specific trainsets are often employed. Nevertheless, with accessibility becoming a greater concern as Japan's population ages, raising the level of the platform itself (in tandem with other improvements such as elevators and escalators) is seen as the most practical solution.

In at least one case, with the E721 series EMU used on JR East lines in the Tohoku region, the floor of the train itself is lowered to be nearly level to existing 920 mm (36 in) platforms. This makes level boarding feasible at many stations (and boarding more convenient at stations with the lowest 760 mm (30 in) platforms). However, this (along with a different standard of electrification) also makes through service southward to Tokyo impossible, and prevents them from running on certain through lines, such as the Senseki-Tohoku Line, since the Senseki Line portion uses the higher 1,100 mm (43 1/2 in) platforms (and DC electrification).

In contrast to the above standards, the standard gauge Shinkansen (Bullet Train) has, since its original inception, used only 1,250 mm (49 in) platforms. However, exceptions from this include the "Mini-shinkansen" Yamagata Shinkansen and Akita Shinkansen lines, which use 1,100 mm (43 1/2 in) platforms to maintain compatibility with conventional JR trainsets.

Most standard gauge non-JR commuter railways, such as Kintetsu Nara Line and Keisei Line, use 1,250 mm (49 in) platforms.

=== North Korea ===
North Korea's platforms are standardized at 1,250 mm (49 in) only. In there, 1,250 mm (49 in) is the norm, lower-level platforms are already raised to this height.

=== South Korea ===
Korail adopted 550 mm-high (21 1/2 in) platforms to operate KTX. Typically, older platforms are lower than 500 mm. For metro trains, higher platforms of 1,135 mm (44 11/16 in) are used. Nuriro trains use mechanical steps to allow both types of platform. Korail has a long-term plan to change platform standards to higher platforms; both KTX-Eum and EMU-320 are designed to use higher platforms.

=== Philippines ===
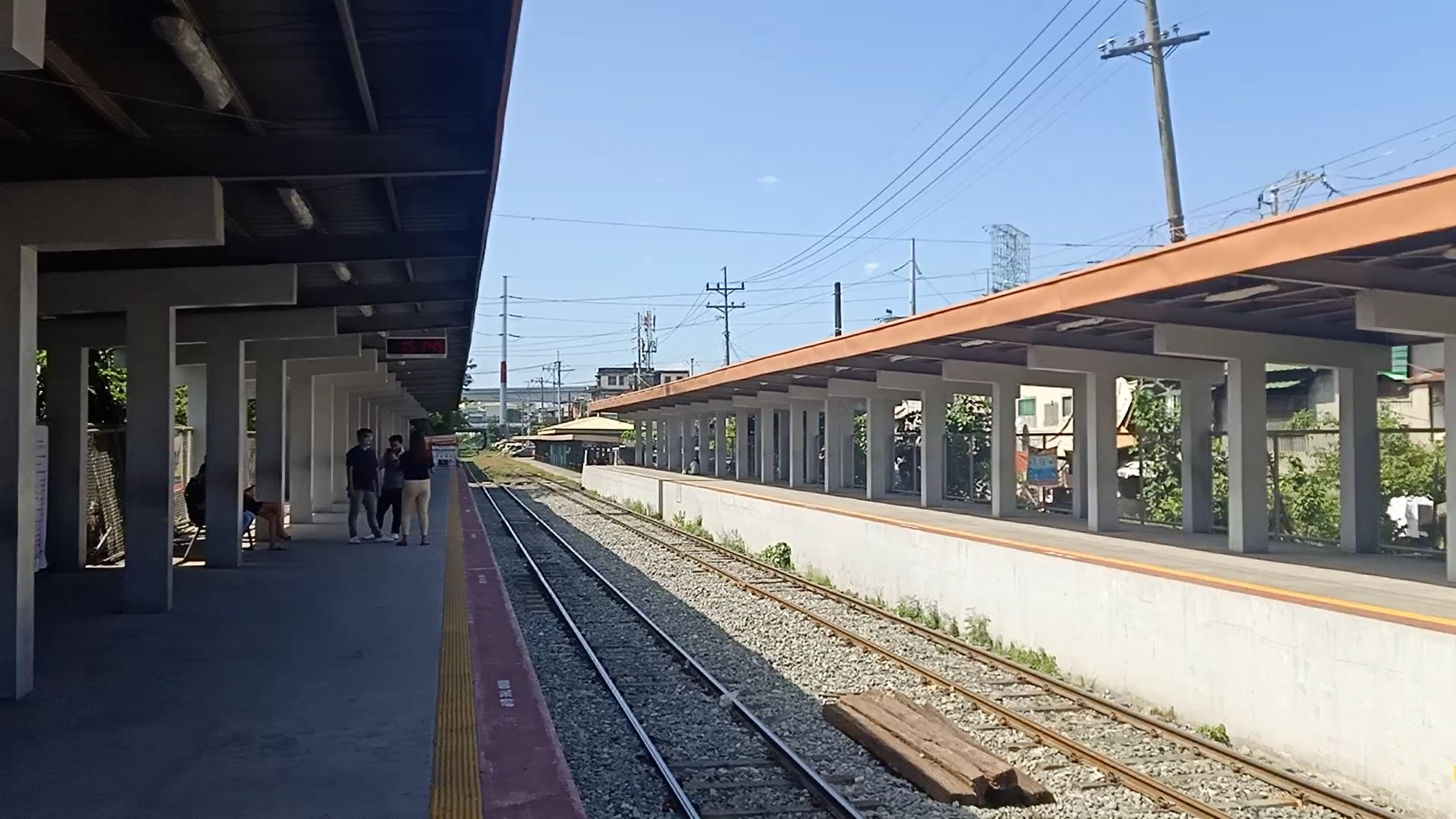
Older 200 mm platforms (background) and newer 1,100 mm platforms at Santa Mesa station

There are various platform heights for railway lines in the Philippines. For heavy rail and commuter rail systems such as the LRT Line 2 and the PNR Metro Commuter Line, most stations are generally set at 1,100 mm (43 1/2 in). For the LRT Line 1 and MRT Line 3 which use light rail vehicles, the platform heights are at 620 mm (24 1/2 in) and 920 mm (36 in), respectively. Future train lines such as the Metro Manila Subway and the North–South Commuter Railway will use the same heavy rail standard at 1,100 mm (43 1/2 in), while the PNR South Long Haul's platform height will be the Chinese standard of 1,250 mm (49 in).

Previously, the Philippine National Railways had lower platforms prior to the 2009 reconstruction of its network. Some stations such as Santa Mesa have its 200 mm (8 in) curb height platforms still intact as of 2020, while others such as Naga and EDSA have 760 mm (30 in) platforms built during the early 2000s.

=== Taiwan ===
Taiwan high-speed rail platforms are 1,250 mm (49 in) above rail.

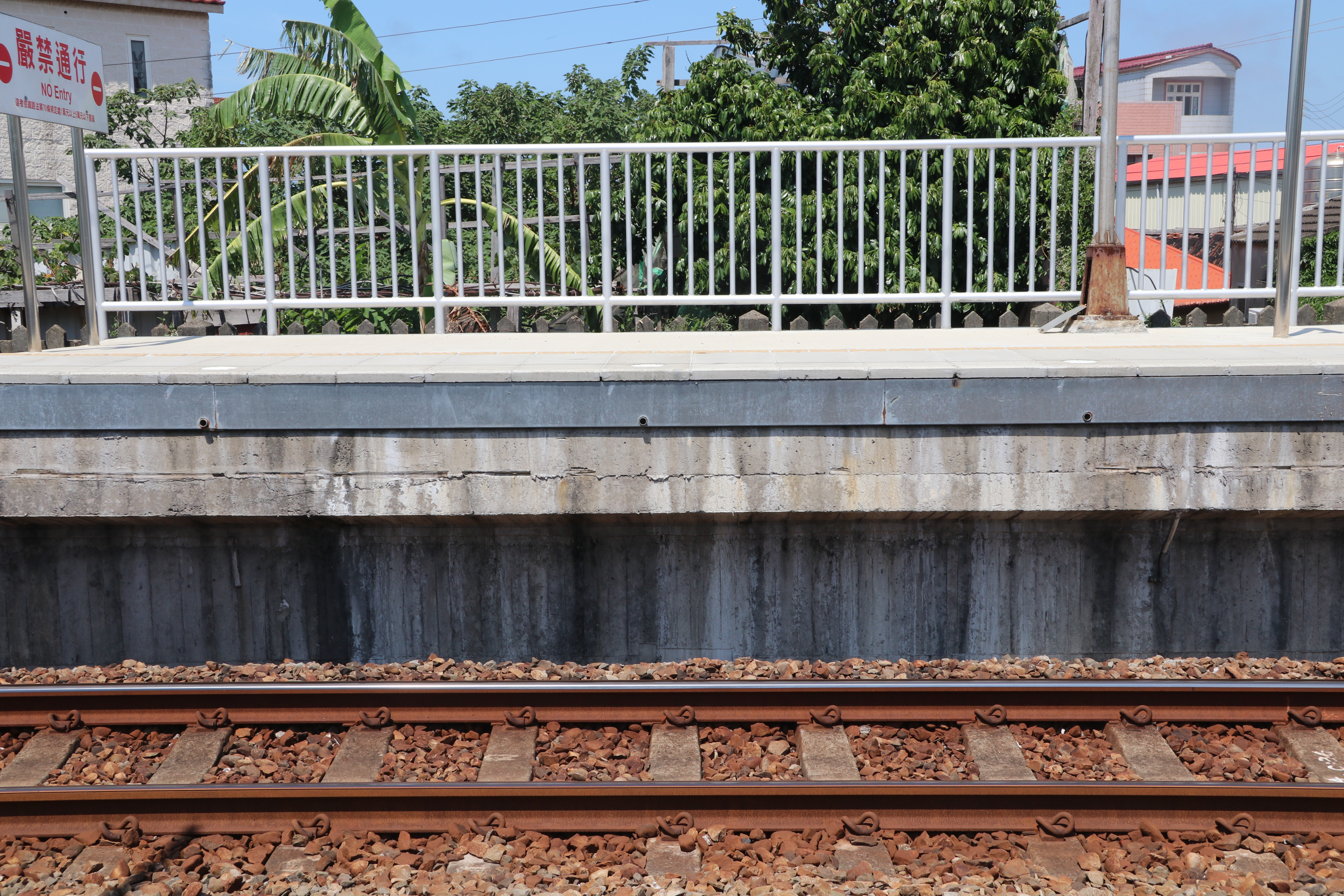
Example of a platform whose height was raised.

In Taiwan, Taiwan Railway's platforms were 760 mm (30 in) tall and passengers must take two stair steps to enter the train. In 2001, however, the platforms were raised to 960 mm (38 in), cutting the steps needed to one. Between 2016 and 2020, platforms were again raised to 1,150 mm (45 1/2 in), and the unnecessary gap on trains were filled in.

=== Thailand ===
Old railway platforms are usually less than 500 mm (20 in) in height. New platforms along double tracking projects, red line projects, and metro stations are built at 1,100 mm (43 1/2 in) height. Bang Bamru railway station is built with both high and low platforms.

== Eurasia ==
=== Kazakhstan ===
In Kazakhstan, only Astana Nurly Jol station and Russian Railway's Petropavlovsk station have 550 mm (21 1/2 in) platforms. Almost everywhere else, the platforms are 200 mm (8 in) above top of rail.

=== Russia ===
As of late 2015, there are three standard heights of platforms, which include:

- 200 mm (8 in) for long-distance trains (originally locomotive-hauled step-fitted passenger carriages);
- 1,100 mm (43 1/2 in) for direct-current only commuter trains (step-less direct current commuter electric multiple units at a time when long-distance trains were not); and
- 550 mm (21 1/2 in) for shared platforms that could serve both with relatively little discomfort (roughly level with the steps on passenger carriages but not too low to board commuter trains).

In some urban areas, such as Moscow and St Petersburg, served only by local traffic, use 1,100 mm (43 1/2 in) platforms for direct-current electric multiple units. Elsewhere, 550 mm (21 1/2 in) and even 200 mm (8 in) platforms are almost commonplace. In some cases, such as VR Sm4 of Finland, the floor of the train itself lowered to be nearly level to 550 mm (21 1/2 in) platforms. This makes level boarding feasible at some stations (and boarding less of a hassle at stations with the lowest 200 mm (8 in) platforms).

The proposed 1,676 mm (5 ft 6 in) Indian gauge Indo-Siberian railways (Note: The proposed 1,676 mm (5 ft 6 in) Indian gauge railways which will seamless link from the Indian subcontinent to the Russian Far East and the Russian Arctic, through Central Asia.) platforms will be 200 mm (8 in) above top of rail.

=== Turkey ===
In Turkey, the standard platform height for commuter railways is 1,050 mm (41 1/2 in) and for mainline & high-speed railways it's 550 mm (21 1/2 in).

== Europe ==
=== European Union ===
Application of the European Union's standard heights for new construction: Green = 550 mm, Blue = 760 mm, Turquoise = both, Dark gray = New builds in other heights than the EU standards

The European Union Commission issued a TSI (Technical Specifications for Interoperability) on 30 May 2002 (2002/735/EC) that sets out standard platform heights for passenger steps on high-speed rail. These standard heights are 550 and 760 mm (21 1/2 and 30 in) (Note: In reference to EU documentation on interoperability of trans-national high-speed rail (see EU Directive 96/48/EC) platform height is measured from the top of the running surface of the rail). There are special cases: 840 mm (33 in) for the Netherlands, 915 mm (36 in) for Great Britain, and 915 mm (36 in) for Ireland.

==== Channel Tunnel ====
Platforms for Eurotunnel Shuttle are 1,100 mm (43 1/2 in) above rails.

==== Rail Baltica ====
The 1,435 mm (4 ft 8 1/2 in) European standard gauge Rail Baltica II platforms will be 760 mm (30 in) above rails.

=== Belgium ===
Belgium has been using mixed type of platform heights (due to the age of the network, and the different companies running it before 1923). As of 2017 the most common platform heights for small stop places and stations are low platform heights of 280 mm (11 in).

There is a plan to comply with the European TSI by raising all low platform heights to one of the European Standard Heights. Most stations will by then be equipped with 550 mm platforms, and direct current EMUs dedicated platforms will be upgraded in their final version to 760 mm. Some stations, or stopping points, already having 760 mm platform heights will keep the platforms at these heights.

=== Finland ===
In Finland, the current standard platform height is 550 mm (21 3/4 in). Platforms built to the older standard are 265 mm (10 1/2 in) above top of rail.

The sole exception on the national railway network is the Nikkilä halt which has a platform height of 400 mm (15.8 in).

=== France ===
The standard height for all platforms in France is 550 mm (21 1/2 in), following the European guidelines. However, this rule is not respected for parts of the RER and Transilien network.

=== Germany ===
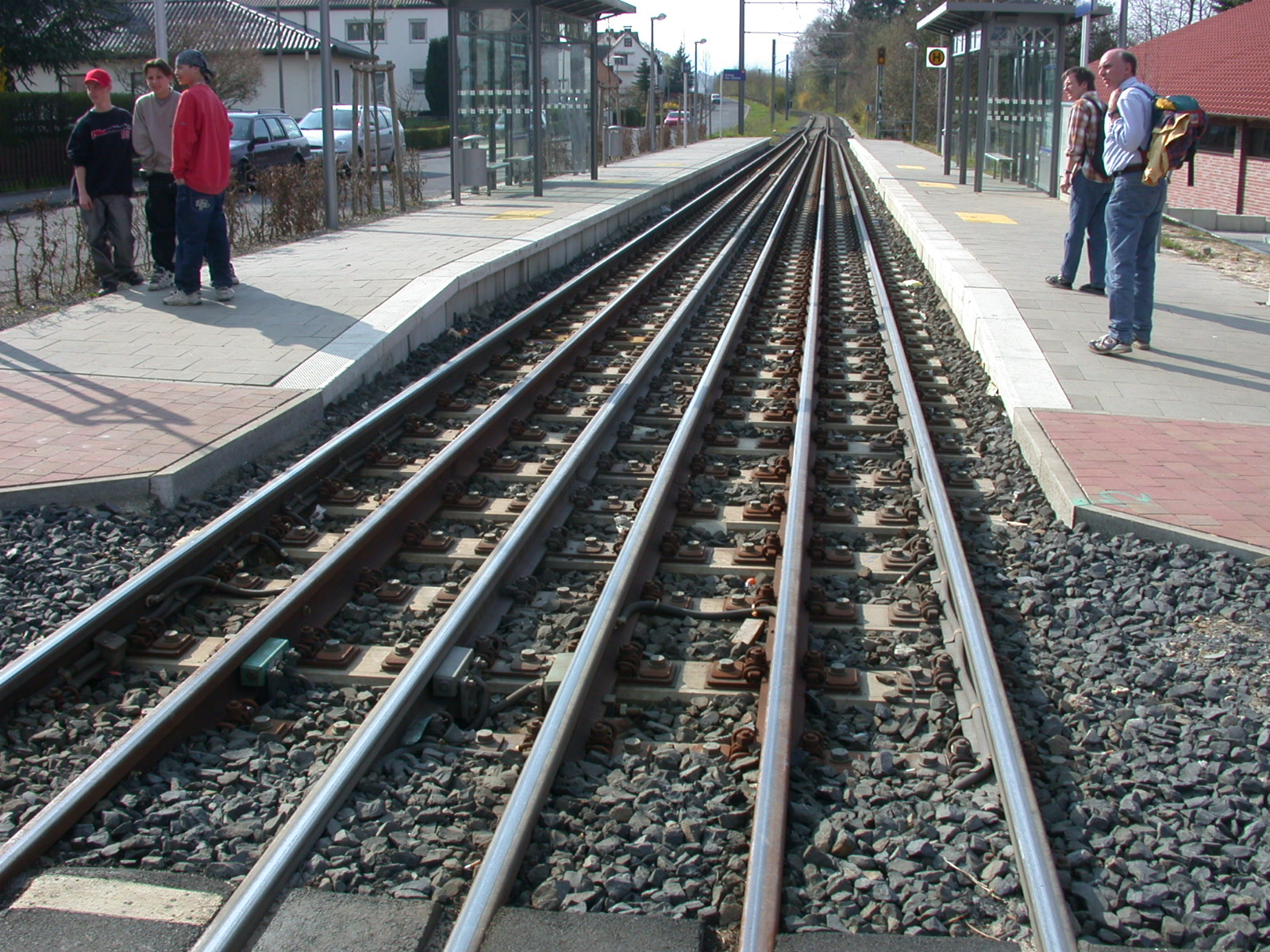
Triple gauntlet track in Kaufungen, Germany. Wider mainline trains go down the centre; narrower trams switch either to the left, or right, to be closer to the relevant platform. Beyond the station, the rails return to single track.

Germany's EBO standard specifies an allowable range between 380 mm (15 in) and 960 mm (38 in). This does not include light rail systems that follow the BOStrab standard, with newer metro lines to use low-floor trams which have a usual floor height of 300 to 350 mm (12 to 14 in) so that platforms are constructed as low as 300 mm in accordance with BOStrab that requires the platform height not to be higher than the floor height.

The traditional platforms had a very diverse height as the nationwide railway network is a union of earlier railway operators. Prior to followed by the European TSI standard the EBO standard requires that new platform construction be at a regular height of 760 mm (30 in). The TSI standard of 550 mm (21 1/2 in) height, historically common in the East, is widely used on regional lines. Only the S-Bahn suburban rail systems had a higher platform height and these are standardized on 960 mm (38 in).

=== Ireland ===
While older platforms on the Dublin and Kingstown Railway were at lower levels, all platforms are now 910 mm (36 in) above rail and all new platforms are being built at that level. Amongst other work, there is an ongoing program of platform renewal. Both of Ireland's railway companies (Irish Rail in the Republic of Ireland and Northern Ireland Railways in Northern Ireland) have had some derogations from EU standards as their mainline rail systems, while connected to each other, are not connected to any other system.

The electric DART fleet has carriage floors at 1,070 mm (42 in) above top of rail creating a step of 150 mm (6 in), while the diesel fleet is typically one step (150 to 200 mm or 6 to 8 in) higher than the platform.

On Dublin's Luas tram system, platforms are approximately 280 mm (11 in) above rail. Tram floors are at the same height, but have internal steps over the bogies.

=== Luxembourg ===
The 760 mm (30 in) platforms for the Namur-Luxembourg line. The remainder of the network, the platforms are 380 mm (15 in) above rails.

=== Netherlands ===
European Commission decision 2002/735/EC which concerns trans-European interoperability for high-speed rail specifies that rolling stock be built for operational suitability platform height of 840 mm (33 in) . Dutch infrastructure manager ProRail has committed to upgrading all stations to 760 mm (30 in) platform height.

=== Poland ===
Typical platforms in Poland are 760 mm (30 in) high. In some rural or urban/suburban areas (e.g. around Warsaw) platforms used by local traffic are lower or higher (550 to 1,060 mm or 21 1/2 to 41 1/2 in). All newly built platforms are 550 or 760 millimetres (21 1/2 or 30 in) high.

=== Portugal ===
Platforms heights in Portugal are not standardized and there are numerous different heights used. Some are as high as 1100 mm (43.3 in) like all stations on the Cascais Line, and some are as low as 15 mm (0.6 in), such as Lavre station platform 2. The most common heights are 900 mm (35.4 in), used in most stations on the Lisbon and Porto suburban train networks, 760 mm (29.9 in), the most common for the Beira Alta Line, and 685 mm (27 in), the most common on the Beira Baixa Line.

The other platforms heights used are 200 mm, 240 mm, 250 mm, 300 mm, 310 mm, 320 mm, 350 mm, 360 mm, 370 mm, 380 mm, 400 mm, 420 mm, 450 mm, 470 mm, 480 mm, 490 mm, 500 mm, 510 mm, 540 mm, 550 mm, 560 mm, 600 mm, 620 mm, 650 mm, 680 mm, 700 mm, 780 mm, 800 mm, 820 mm, 825 mm, 830 mm, 850 mm, 860 mm, 880 mm, 910 mm, 920 mm, 930 mm, 940 mm, 950 mm and 1000 mm.

=== Spain ===
While older platforms in Spain are lower than the rest of Europe, many platforms are now 680 mm (27 in) above rail. Following track gauge conversion from Iberian gauge to standard gauge, platforms to be raised to 1,250 mm (49 in) for new regional trainsets.

=== Sweden ===
Before the introduction of EU standards, Sweden had three unique platform heights: low (350 mm (14 in)), medium (580 mm (23 in)), and high (730 mm (28 1/2 in)). Today, all new platforms must comply with EU regulations. The low platform standard was banned for new construction, while the medium and high standards were redefined to 550 mm (21 1/2 in) and 760 mm (30 in), respectively. As platforms are refurbished to comply with accessibility requirements or due to changes in track layout, they are adjusted to the newly redefined heights. There is a hard limit to platform height at 770 mm (30 1/2 in) due to the fact that the Swedish dynamic loading gauge allows trains to be wider than the platform allows and overhang the platform by as much as 200 mm (8 in) at a height above 780 mm (30 1/2 in).

The Stockholm commuter rail network is the only remaining operator that prefers the high platform standard of 760 mm. As a result, only stations exclusively used by these trains are built to this height. Platforms that are shared with other operators, such as Arlanda Central station, are built to medium height of 550 mm (occasionally 580 mm). This causes some problems, as the X60 trainsets used on Stockholm's commuter rail are designed for level boarding at 760 mm. For this reason, all other commuter rail operators in Sweden chose to purchase trains with level boarding at 550 mm, such as the very similar X61 trainsets used by operators like Västtrafik and Pågatåg. These operators, along with others, previously had platforms at 730 mm for X11 trainsets, which have since been lowered to 550 mm. With the exception of a handful of stations used by the Stockholm commuter rail network, Sweden has effectively adopted the 550 mm platform height as the national standard.

The Arlanda Express service, which has special status, operates with its own platforms at a height of 1,150 mm (45 1/2 in). Since these platforms are separated from the main line, they are permitted to exceed the 770 mm height limit. The Stockholm Metro and Saltsjöbanan light rail, which are separate networks, have 1,125 mm (44 1/2 in) high platforms, all other tramways have very low platforms, often also used by buses which must allow boarding from places without platform.

=== United Kingdom ===
The standard height for platforms in the United Kingdom is 915 mm (36 in) with a tolerance of ±25 mm (1 in). On the Heathrow Express the platform height is specified at 1,100 mm (43 1/4 in).

The new stations on High Speed 2 are being built with a platform height of 1,115 mm (44 in), which does not conform to the European Union technical standards for interoperability for high-speed rail (EU Directive 96/48/EC). The trains procured for HS2 will be built to accommodate level boarding from platforms at this height. These trains will also operate outside of the HS2 line using existing infrastructure, where they will not be step free. High Speed 1 has a platform height of 760 mm (30 in) on its international platforms. The Great Western Main Line, North London Line, Gospel Oak to Barking Line and Great Eastern Main Line platforms will be mixture of 760 mm (30 in) (for intercity trains) and 1,100 mm (43 1/4 in) (for London commuter trains).

== North America ==
=== Canada ===
==== Intercity and commuter rail ====
In Canada, Via Rail intercity trains have level boarding with platforms 48 inches (1,219 mm) above the top of rail at Montreal Central Station, Quebec City Gare du Palais and a single platform at Ottawa station. The remainder of stations in the Via Rail network have low platforms 5 inches (127 mm) to 8 inches (203 mm) above the rail.

GO Transit regional trains have a floor height of 610 millimetres (24 in) above the top of rail, and GO Transit plans to raise platforms to provide level boarding at that height. Currently, platforms are 127 millimetres (5 in) above the top of rail, with a raised "mini-platform" which provides level boarding from one door of the train.

Exo commuter trains have level boarding with platforms 48, 50, or 51 inches (1,219, 1,270, or 1,295 mm) above the top of rail at Montreal Central, Côte-de-Liesse, Repentigny, Terrebonne, and Mascouche stations. The remainder of stations in the Exo network have low platforms 5 or 8 inches (127 or 203 mm) above the top of rail.

All UP Express stations have level boarding with platforms 48 inches (1,219 mm) above the top of rail.

West Coast Express has accessible boarding platforms at all stations. However, unlike the SkyTrain, there is a small height difference and door-level for wheelchair access are provided at all stations.

==== Metro and light rail ====
All rapid transit and light rail systems, except for the Toronto streetcar system, provide level boarding between trains and platforms. The platform heights vary per line, as per the table below.

| City | Network/Line | Platform height |
|---|---|---|
| Calgary | C-Train LRT | 890 mm (35 1/32 in) |
| Edmonton | High-Floor LRT | 890 mm (35 1/32 in) |
| Edmonton | Low-Floor LRT | 329 mm (12 15/16 in) |
| Kitchener-Waterloo | Ion LRT | 329 mm (12 15/16 in) |
| Montreal | Metro | 1,194 mm (47 in) above top of rail |
| Montreal | REM | Unknown |
| Ottawa | O-Train (lines 1 and 3) | unknown |
| Ottawa | O-Train (lines 2 and 4) | 553 mm (21 25/32 in) |
| Toronto | Subway (lines 1, 2, and 4) | 1,105 mm (43 1/2 in) |
| Toronto | RT (Line 3) | Unknown |
| Toronto | LRT (lines 5 and 6) | 329 mm (12 15/16 in) |
| Vancouver | SkyTrain | 800 mm (31 1/2 in) |

On the Toronto streetcar system, most stops are in mixed traffic accessed from the road surface, without raised platforms. Where raised platforms do exist, they are at sidewalk curb height and not at the height of the vehicle floor. As a result, people using wheeled mobility aids need to use the wheelchair ramp even at stops where a raised platform exists.

=== United States ===
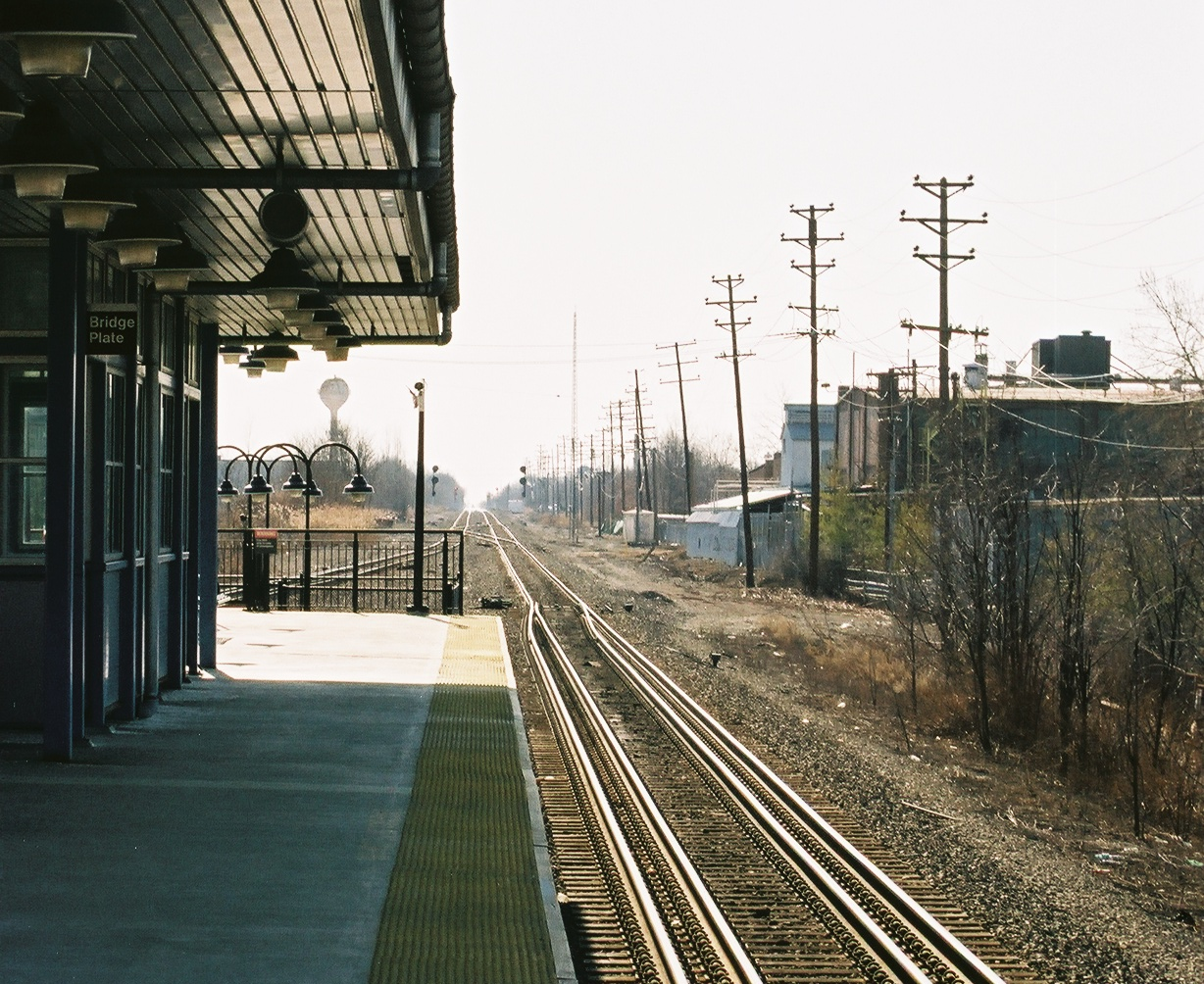
Gauntlet track on Conrail's Lehigh Line at Union station in Union, New Jersey

New and substantially renovated stations in the United States must comply with the Americans with Disabilities Act, which requires level boarding. Most inter-city and commuter rail systems use either 48-inch (1,219 mm) high platforms that allow level boarding, or 8-inch (203 mm) low platforms. Metro and light rail systems feature a variety of different platform heights.

==== Intercity and commuter rail with high platforms ====
Most commuter rail systems in the northeastern United States have standardized on high platforms at 48-inch (1,219 mm) above top of rail, and is in general the floor height of single-deck trains. This standard was used by the Pennsylvania Railroad which began installing high platforms on its subsidiary the Long Island Rail Road in 1910 with the introduction of MP54 railcars. MBTA Commuter Rail, CTrail's Hartford Line and Shore Line East, Long Island Rail Road, Metro-North Railroad, NJ Transit, and SEPTA Regional Rail all use this height for new and renovated stations, though low platforms remain at some older stations.

MARC has high-level platforms at every Penn Line station from Washington to Baltimore except West Baltimore (which will be rebuilt with high platforms in the coming years). Due to required freight train clearances and Amtrak Superliner usage of some stations, most of the Camden Line, Brunswick Line, and segment of the Penn Line north of Baltimore have low platforms. The exceptions are Baltimore-Camden and Monocacy (stations outside of freight routes), as well as Greenbelt (station with passing tracks), all of which feature high platforms.

Outside the Northeast U.S., RTD, WES Commuter Rail, and SMART use 48-inch high platforms. Metra Electric District and South Shore Line use platforms at 51.5-inch (1,308 mm) above top of rail.

Amtrak intercity services feature high-level platforms on the Northeast Corridor, Keystone Corridor, Empire Corridor, and New Haven–Springfield Line, although some stations on these lines have not been retrofitted with high platforms. High-level platforms are also present at a small number of stations on other lines, including Worcester, Roanoke, Raleigh, and several Downeaster stations. Brightline service in Florida also uses high level platforms.

At some stations, a desired high-level platform is impractical due to wide freight trains or other practicalities. (Gauntlet tracks, which permit wide freights to pass full-length high-level platforms, have practical issues of their own.) At these locations, mini-high platforms are often used for accessibility. Mini-high platforms have a short length of high platform, long enough for one or two doors, with an accessible ramp to the longer low platform. The platform edge is usually hinged so that it can be flipped out of the way of passing freights.

==== Intercity and commuter rail with low platforms ====
Most other commuter rail systems in the U.S. and Amtrak stations have 8-inch (203 mm) low-level platforms to accommodate freight trains, with mini-high platforms or portable lifts to reach the 22-inch (559 mm)-high floors of low-level bilevel railcars. Single-deck cars, which generally serve the prevalent high platforms in the Northeast, feature trapdoors that expose stairs so that passengers can access the low platforms.

Double-deck commuter railcars are designed to be compatible with single-deck cars by having a third, intermediate deck above the bogies at both ends, with a matching floor height of 48 inches (1,219 mm). (Mixed consists of double decks and single decks can sometimes be seen in the FrontRunner system in Utah.) The Bombardier BiLevel Coach is used on many commuter rail networks in North America, with Coaster having 22-inch (559 mm) platforms to match their floor height. Caltrain's new electrified trains will be equipped for both 22-and-50.5-inch (559 and 1,283 mm) heights in anticipation of sharing facilities with California High-Speed Rail trains. A small number of systems do use low-floor single deck trains, including TEXRail and others that use Stadler FLIRT and GTW rolling stock.

All of Amtrak's bilevel cars, which are all Superliners, are entirely low-floor and have step-free passthroughs on the upper deck, with the exception of "transition" sleeper cars where one end features stairs to maintain compatibility with single-deck cars (including Amtrak's own baggage cars).

==== Metro and light rail ====
Platform heights of metro systems vary by system and even by line. For example, on the MBTA subway system in the Greater Boston area, Blue Line platforms are 41.5 inches (1,054 mm) above top of rail (ATR), while Orange Line platforms are at 45 inches (1,143 mm), and Red Line platforms are at 49 inches (1,245 mm). Bay Area Rapid Transit stations have platform heights of 39 inches (991 mm).

Most light rail systems have platforms around 12–14 inches (300–360 mm) ATR, allowing level boarding on low-floor light rail vehicles. Most new systems are built to this standard, and some older systems like VTA light rail have been converted. Several systems including MetroLink use higher platforms with level boarding. Several older light rail systems have high-floor vehicles but low platforms, with mini-high platforms or lifts for accessibility. Some, like the MBTA Green Line, are being converted to low-floor rolling stock, while others, like Baltimore Light Rail have permanent mini-high platforms. Muni Metro has 34-inch (864 mm) high platforms in the subway section as well as some surface stops, and mini-high platforms at other surface stops; the vehicles have movable stairs inside to serve both high and low platforms.

== Oceania ==
=== Australia ===
The majority of railway systems in Australia use high level platforms with a platform height at or slightly below the train floor level. This conforms with Australian Standard AS 7633 Railway infrastructure: Clearances prepared by the Rail Industry Safety and Standards Board, which recommends a nominal platform height of 1,080 mm (3 ft 7 in) above top of rail. Where level boarding is not possible, AS 7633 recommends that the platform height should be set with a step up into the train.

The standard 1,080 mm platform height is required for all metropolitan and regional stations in Victoria. However, railways in Queensland have narrow gauge trains and lower platforms, and railways in South Australia have trains fitted with low level steps to enable the use of low level platforms.

In New South Wales, by 2000, the platform step (the difference between the platform height and the train floor height) had been allowed to grow to a maximum of about 300 mm (12 in), which was uncomfortably large. For Sydney's 2000 Olympics, new and altered platforms were designed to match the Tangara trains, which are 3,000 mm (9 ft 10 1/8 in) wide, leaving a platform gap of about 80 mm (3 1/8 in) and a step height close to zero. This has become the standard for all subsequent platforms and trains in NSW.

==== Metro and light rail ====
The tramway network in Melbourne have some low level platforms and low floor vehicles, but most trams have steps and are boarded from the road. The Adelaide Tram line has low platforms at almost all stops and operates almost entirely with low-floor trams which also have retractable ramps for street boarding where required by persons unable to step up. The Gold Coast and Sydney light rail networks have low floor trams and platforms at all stops.

=== New Zealand ===
According to KiwiRail specifications, Auckland Metro platforms are offset 1520 mm (+10 / -0 mm) from centre line and 750 mm (+0 / 20 mm) high while other platforms at major, suburban or terminus stations including Wellington Metro are offset 1450 mm (+10 / -0 mm) from centre line and 680 mm (+0 / -20 mm) high. Both specifications apply to straight sections with allowances for versine, end throw and cant on curves.

== South America ==
=== Argentina ===
Platforms for long-distance trains are 200 mm (8 in) above rail, and platforms for Buenos Aires commuter trains are 1,100 mm (43 1/2 in).

== See also ==
- Berne gauge
- Gauntlet track
- High-floor
- Loading gauge
- Platform gap
- Street running
- Tram stop
