= Port Reading Junction =

Coordinates: 40.547657°N 74.57624°W

Port Reading Junction is a major rail junction (MANS) in Manville, New Jersey serving rail freight travelling between the Port of New York and New Jersey in Gateway Region of western New Jersey and points to the south and west. It is the site of Manville Yard.

== History ==
1923 map

The junction was originally developed in 1890 by the Reading Railroad Trenton Line near the Lehigh Valley Railroad Main Line to access Port Reading on the Arthur Kill in Woodbridge Township, mostly for coal transshipments. and a spur to Perth Amboy.

The railyard adjacent to the junction is sometimes still referred to as Weston as the part of Manville was once called from the larger community Weston.

== Freight rail ==
The junction is at the convergence of the Norfolk Southern Railway Lehigh Line, the Conrail Shared Assets Operations Lehigh Line, and the CSX Transportation Trenton Subdivision, the last of which runs along the original ROW for Reading Line and the proposed West Trenton Line connection to the Raritan Valley Line. The junction was expanded in 2008 to accommodate the approximately 40 trains per day that were using it. It now consists of four tracks.

== See also ==
- Port Reading Refinery
- List of New Jersey railroad junctions
- List of New Jersey railroads
