= Port Reading Refinery =

Oil refinery in New Jersey, United States

- Location of the Port Reading Refinery Port Reading Refinery (New Jersey) Port Reading Refinery (the United States)
- Location: Perth Amboy and Port Reading, New Jersey, United States; 40.564°N 74.249°W

Refinery details
- Owner: Hess Corporation
- Opened: 1958
- Closed: 2013

Port Reading Refinery, also known as Hess Refinery (photo), was an oil refinery located in Perth Amboy and Port Reading, New Jersey. It was constructed by Hess Oil under Leon Hess in 1958. It was a simple refinery which further processed other refinery's product which began with heavy sour crude. It was owned by the Hess Corporation, refiners of Hess brand gasoline. The refinery itself had outlets that connected with Arthur Kill, enabling oil barges to make passage into the refinery's commons. The refinery had a neon red "HESS" sign on its cracking unit which was removed in December 2013 after the property was sold. The refinery was closed in February 2013.

== See also ==
- Bayway Refinery
- Perth Amboy Refinery
- Chemical Coast
- Port of Paulsboro
