= Port Reading, New Jersey =

Populated place in Middlesex County, New Jersey, US

- Census-designated place
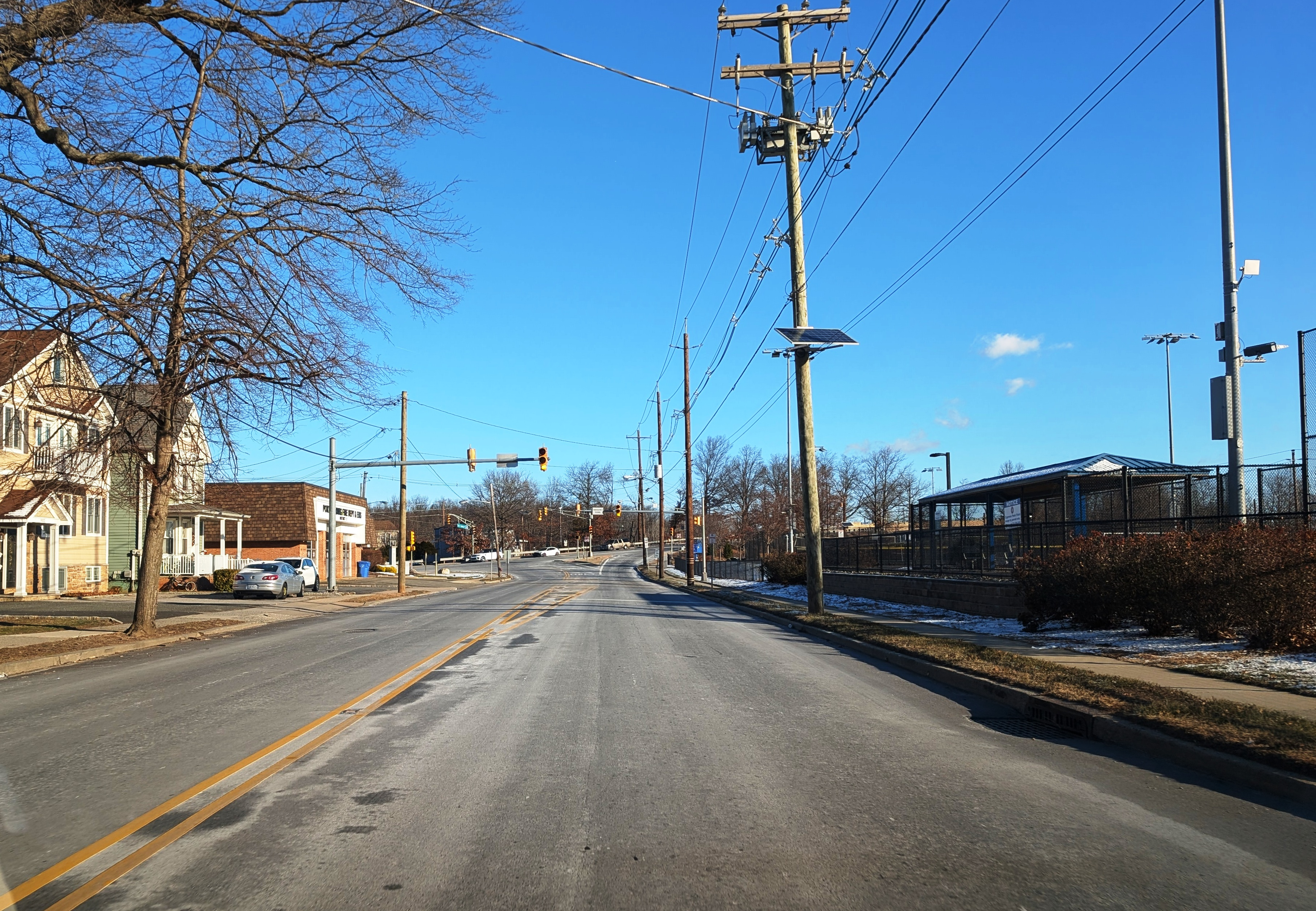
- Northbound West Avenue (CR 611) in Port Reading

- Location of Port Reading in Middlesex County highlighted in red (left). Inset map: Location of Middlesex County in New Jersey highlighted in orange (right).

- Location in Middlesex County Location in New Jersey Location in the United States
- Coordinates: 40.561643°N 74.244018°W
- Country: United States
- State: New Jersey
- County: Middlesex
- Township: Woodbridge

Area
  - Total: 2.20 sq mi (5.70 km^{2})
  - Land: 1.98 sq mi (5.12 km^{2})
  - Water: 0.23 sq mi (0.59 km^{2}) 22.61%
- Elevation: 13 ft (4 m)

Population (2020)
  - Total: 3,921
  - Density: 1,984.1/sq mi (766.05/km^{2})
- Time zone: UTC−05:00 (Eastern (EST))
  - Summer (DST): UTC−04:00 (Eastern (EDT))
- ZIP Code: 07064
- Area codes: 732/848
- FIPS code: 34-60540
- GNIS feature ID: 02389698

Port Reading is an unincorporated community and census-designated place (CDP) in Woodbridge Township, Middlesex County, New Jersey, United States. As of the 2020 census, the population was 3,921.

== History ==
Port Reading was built in the late 19th century by the Reading Railroad of Pennsylvania to serve their shipping needs, especially coal from the Pennsylvania anthracite coal fields. In 1892 Port Reading was connected to the Reading Railroad system via a new branch line from Port Reading Junction near Bound Brook, New Jersey, known as the Port Reading Secondary. The Port Reading Refinery was located in the district.

== Geography ==
Port Reading is in northeastern Middlesex County, in the northeast part of Woodbridge Township. It is bordered to the north and east by the borough of Carteret, to the northwest by Avenel within Woodbridge Township, to west by Woodbridge proper, and to the south by Sewaren, also within Woodbridge Township. It is bordered to the southeast by the tidal Arthur Kill, across which is Staten Island, New York.

The New Jersey Turnpike passes through Port Reading, with the closest access being Exit 12 in Carteret.

According to the U.S. Census Bureau, Port Reading has an area of 2.20 square miles (5.70 km^{2}), including 1.98 square miles (5.13 km^{2}) of land and 0.23 square miles (0.60 km^{2}) of water (10.26%) lying within the Arthur Kill.

== Demographics ==
Historical population
Census	Pop.	Note	%±
1990	3,977		—
2000	3,829		−3.7%
2010	3,728		−2.6%
2020	3,921		5.2%
Population sources: 1950 1960 1970; 1980 1990 2000; 2010 2020

Port reading first appeared as a census designated place in the 1990 U.S. census.

=== Racial and ethnic composition ===
Port Reading CDP, New Jersey – Racial and ethnic composition Note: the US Census treats Hispanic/Latino as an ethnic category. This table excludes Latinos from the racial categories and assigns them to a separate category. Hispanics/Latinos may be of any race.
Race / Ethnicity (NH = Non-Hispanic)	Pop 2000	Pop 2010	Pop 2020	% 2000	% 2010	% 2020
White alone (NH)	3,299	2,566	1,978	86.16%	68.83%	50.45%
Black or African American alone (NH)	91	238	313	2.38%	6.38%	7.98%
Native American or Alaska Native alone (NH)	0	7	3	0.00%	0.19%	0.08%
Asian alone (NH)	92	186	449	2.40%	4.99%	11.45%
Native Hawaiian or Pacific Islander alone (NH)	0	0	1	0.00%	0.00%	0.03%
Other race alone (NH)	1	16	34	0.03%	0.43%	0.87%
Mixed race or Multiracial (NH)	56	50	117	1.46%	1.34%	2.98%
Hispanic or Latino (any race)	290	665	1,026	7.57%	17.84%	26.17%
Total	3,829	3,728	3,921	100.00%	100.00%	100.00%

=== 2020 census ===
As of the 2020 census, Port Reading had a population of 3,921. The median age was 40.8 years. 19.8% of residents were under the age of 18 and 17.1% were 65 years of age or older. For every 100 females there were 94.4 males, and for every 100 females age 18 and over there were 91.5 males.

100.0% of residents lived in urban areas, while 0.0% lived in rural areas.

There were 1,278 households, of which 35.9% had children under the age of 18 living in them. Of all households, 53.8% were married-couple households, 14.7% were households with a male householder and no spouse or partner present, and 25.6% were households with a female householder and no spouse or partner present. About 18.0% of all households were made up of individuals and 10.2% had someone living alone who was 65 years of age or older.

There were 1,361 housing units, of which 6.1% were vacant. The homeowner vacancy rate was 1.0% and the rental vacancy rate was 13.9%.

=== 2010 census ===
The 2010 United States census counted 3,728 people, 1,283 households, and 998 families in the CDP. The population density was 1,662.2 people per square mile (641.8 people/km^{2}). There were 1,342 housing units at an average density of 598.3 units per square mile (231.0 units/km^{2}). The racial makeup was 79.75% (2,973) White, 7.19% (268) Black or African American, 0.24% (9) Native American, 4.99% (186) Asian, 0.00% (0) Pacific Islander, 5.53% (206) from other races, and 2.31% (86) from two or more races. Hispanic or Latino of any race were 17.84% (665) of the population.

Of the 1,283 households, 33.2% had children under the age of 18; 57.2% were married couples living together; 15.0% had a female householder with no husband present and 22.2% were non-families. Of all households, 18.7% were made up of individuals and 10.2% had someone living alone who was 65 years of age or older. The average household size was 2.91 and the average family size was 3.31.

22.5% of the population were under the age of 18, 8.5% from 18 to 24, 25.2% from 25 to 44, 27.2% from 45 to 64, and 16.6% who were 65 years of age or older. The median age was 41.2 years. For every 100 females, the population had 96.2 males. For every 100 females ages 18 and older there were 91.1 males.

=== 2000 census ===
As of the 2000 United States census there were 3,829 people, 1,337 households, and 1,069 families living in the CDP. The population density was 663.2 people/km^{2} (1,718 people/mi^{2}). There were 1,357 housing units at an average density of 235.0 units/km^{2} (609 units/mi^{2}). The racial makeup of the CDP was 90.99% White, 2.61% African American, 2.40% Asian, 1.78% from other races, and 2.22% from two or more races. Hispanic or Latino of any race were 7.57% of the population.

There were 1,337 households, out of which 33.3% had children under the age of 18 living with them, 61.2% were married couples living together, 13.2% had a female householder with no husband present, and 20.0% were non-families. 16.2% of all households were made up of individuals, and 7.3% had someone living alone who was 65 years of age or older. The average household size was 2.86 and the average family size was 3.21.

In the CDP the population was spread out, with 23.3% under the age of 18, 7.1% from 18 to 24, 29.8% from 25 to 44, 23.8% from 45 to 64, and 16.0% who were 65 years of age or older. The median age was 39 years. For every 100 females, there were 95.9 males. For every 100 females age 18 and over, there were 93.4 males.

The median income for a household in the CDP was $58,945, and the median income for a family was $64,259. Males had a median income of $50,142 versus $30,283 for females. The per capita income for the CDP was $23,978. About 1.7% of families and 3.2% of the population were below the poverty line, including 5.1% of those under age 18 and 2.0% of those age 65 or over.

== Education ==
Public school

Elementary school (K-6)

- Port Reading School #9

== See also ==
- List of neighborhoods in Woodbridge Township, New Jersey
- List of neighborhoods in Edison, New Jersey
