= Lehigh Line (Conrail) =

Railroad line in northeastern New Jersey

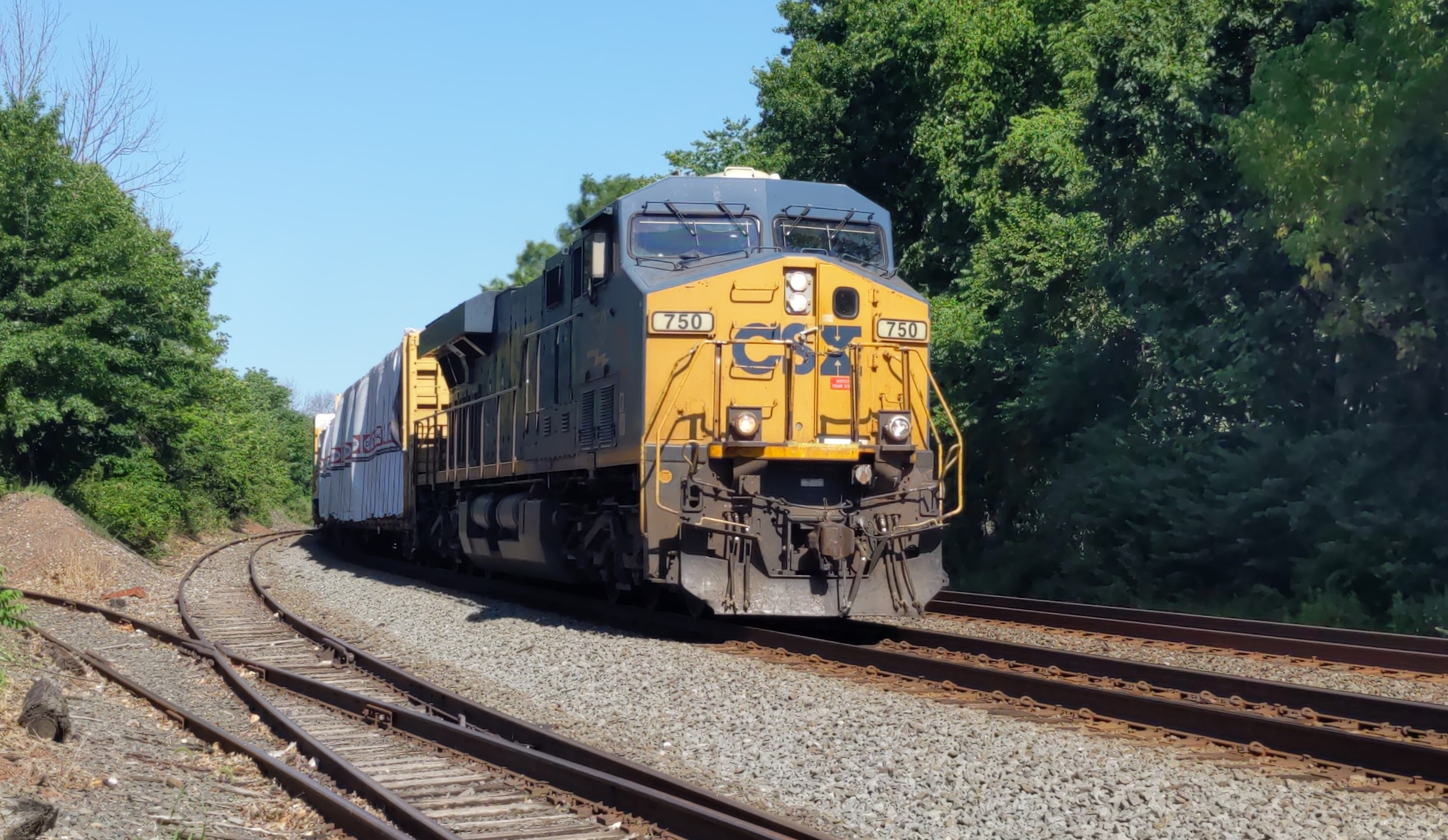
- A CSX commercial train passes Prospect Avenue in Piscataway, New Jersey

Overview
- Status: Operational (1999 - present)
- Owner: Conrail Shared Assets Operations (Split between CSX and Norfolk Southern)
- Locale: Northeastern New Jersey
- Termini: Oak Island Yard in Newark, New Jersey; Port Reading Junction in Manville, New Jersey
- Stations: Union station (NJ Transit) and Roselle Park station, both are operated by New Jersey Transit

Service
- Type: Freight rail
- System: Conrail Shared Assets Operations (Norfolk Southern Railway and CSX Transportation), (with Canadian Pacific trackage rights)
- Operator(s): Conrail Shared Assets Operations (Split between CSX and Norfolk Southern) and New Jersey Transit

History
- Opened: 1999 (spun off from the original Lehigh Line)

Technical
- Number of tracks: 2
- Track gauge: 1,435 mm (4 ft 8 1/2 in) standard gauge

The Conrail Lehigh Line is a railroad line in New Jersey that is part of Conrail Shared Assets Operations under the North Jersey Shared Assets Area division. The line runs from CP Port Reading Junction in Manville to Oak Island Yard in Newark. The line is double-track and signaled through its entire length. The line began operations in 1999 using former existing tracks from Manville to Newark that was once part of the original Lehigh Line which is still in existence and is owned and operated by Norfolk Southern Railway.

The original Lehigh Line was built by the Lehigh Valley Railroad and opened in 1855 in the Lehigh Valley. The line later expanded all the way to Buffalo, New York and then to Jersey City which was later retracted to Newark. The original Lehigh Line and the rest of the Lehigh Valley Railroad was merged into Conrail in 1976 and was downsized in the New York and Pennsylvania. The original Lehigh Line was inherited by Norfolk Southern Railway in 1999 but it did not include the Manville to Newark tracks.

== History ==
The line began operations in 1999 when the existing tracks from Manville to Newark automatically broke away from the original Lehigh Line when Norfolk Southern Railway acquired the original Lehigh Line in the Conrail split between NS and CSX Transportation.

The original Lehigh Line (which is still in existence) was built by the Lehigh Valley Railroad and opened in 1855 in the Lehigh Valley. The original Lehigh Line was the Lehigh Valley's first line and served as the body of the railroad until it built or acquired other rail lines. The original Lehigh Line later expanded in the northwest to Buffalo, New York and expanded east to Perth Amboy, New Jersey. The line's route switched to Newark, New Jersey when new tracks were constructed to the Northeast passed South Plainfield, New Jersey; the new tracks between South Plainfield and Newark became the new mainline and the old part of the line which extends from South Plainfield to Perth Amboy became a branchline. The line's new tracks to the Northeast was extended again to Jersey City, New Jersey but was later pushed back to Newark again.

The original Lehigh Line and the rest of the Lehigh Valley Railroad was absorbed into Conrail in 1976 and was downsized over the years in New York and Pennsylvania. The original Lehigh Line lost its existing tracks from Manville to Newark when Norfolk Southern Railway acquired it in the Conrail split with CSX Transportation in order for both Norfolk Southern and its competitor CSX to have equal competition in the Northeast. The Manville to Newark tracks became a new rail line called the Conrail Lehigh Line.

Norfolk Southern along with its competitor CSX own the new rail line under a joint venture called Conrail Shared Assets Operations; the joint venture is the same company that operated the former Conrail railroad, just reorganized as a terminal railroad under Norfolk Southern and CSX ownership. For historical purposes, the Manville to Newark tracks is considered a new rail line and the Norfolk Southern part is considered the original line.

Canadian Pacific Railway has trackage rights on both the original Lehigh Line and the Conrail Lehigh Line.

== Ownership and operations ==
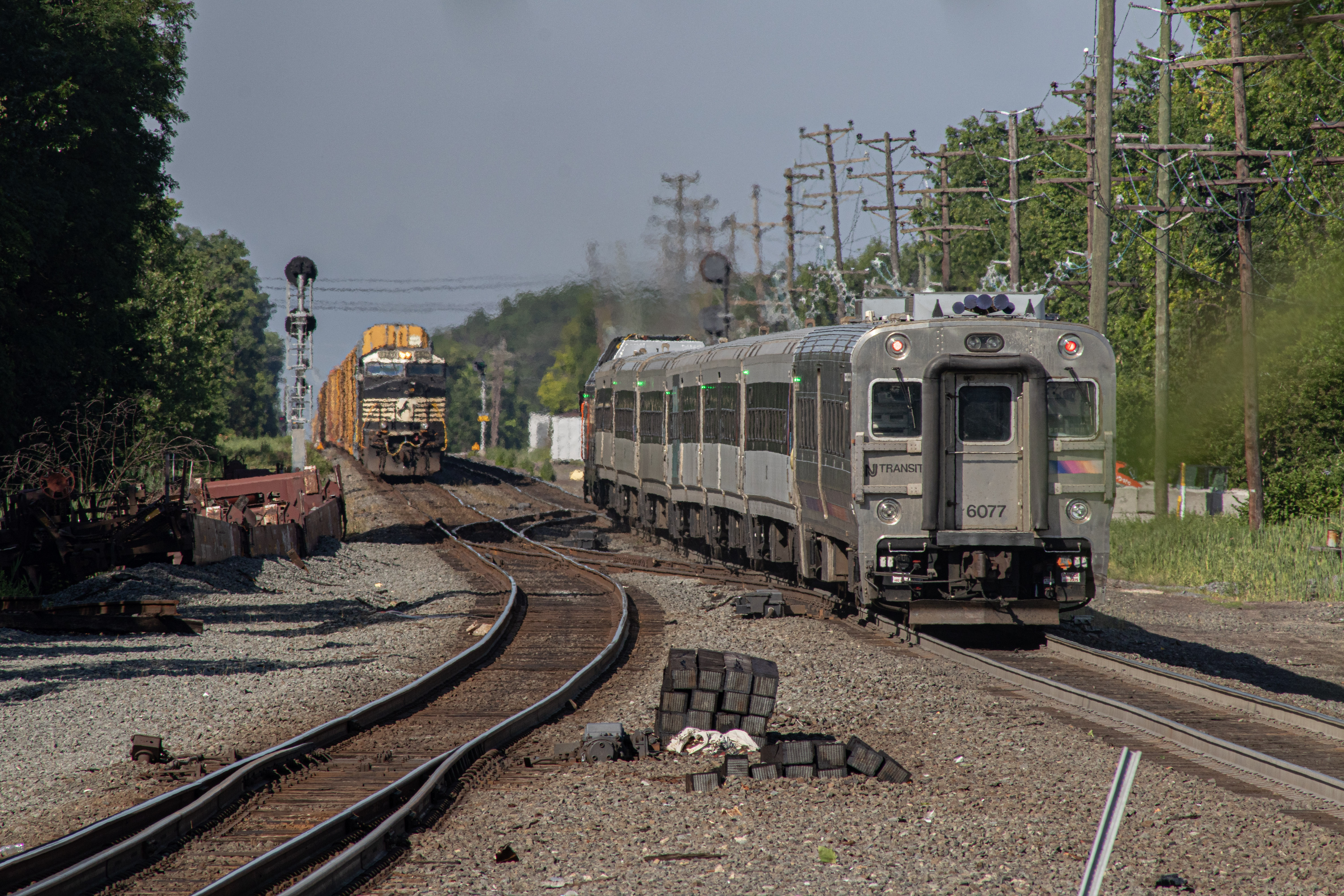
A westbound New Jersey Transit passenger train departs the train station at Union, New Jersey, with an eastbound Norfolk Southern freight train visible in the distance.

The Conrail Lehigh Line is owned and operated by Conrail Shared Assets Operations under the North Jersey Shared Assets Area division. Conrail Shared Assets Operations is owned by Consolidated Rail Corporation (Conrail or Conrail Inc.) which in turn is owned as a joint venture between Norfolk Southern Railway (a Norfolk Southern Corporation company) and CSX Transportation (a CSX Corporation company). Norfolk Southern Railway and CSX Transportation are the only Class 1 railroads that operate on the East Coast.

The line runs from CP Port Reading Junction in Manville, New Jersey to Oak Island Yard in Newark, New Jersey along the former Manville to Newark route and tracks that was once part of the original Lehigh Line which is still in existence; the original Lehigh Line is owned by Norfolk Southern Railway. For historical purposes, the Manville to Newark tracks is considered a new rail line and not the original line and the Norfolk Southern part is considered the original line and not a new rail line. At CP Port Reading Junction in Manville, the Conrail Lehigh Line connects the original Lehigh Line by having the Lehigh Valley Railroad-built tracks continues straight pass Manville as the original Lehigh Line. Also at Manville, the Conrail Lehigh Line connects to the CSX Transportation Trenton Subdivision which was once part of the Reading Railroad; the Trenton Subdivision splits southward heading all the way to Philadelphia.

The line shares track with New Jersey Transit's Raritan Valley Line between Newark and Aldene Junction, and then parallels it closely between Bridgewater, New Jersey and Bound Brook, New Jersey. The Raritan Valley Line is a former Central Railroad of New Jersey line. It makes a roughly parallel, but sometimes diverging route to the Raritan Valley Line, running to the south of that line.

== See also ==
- Lehigh Valley Railroad Bridge
