= Brackin =

Brackin or Brackins is both a surname and a given name. Notable people with the name include:

== Brackin ==
- Patricia Brackin, American engineer
- Robert Livingstone Brackin, Canadian politician
- Thomas Brackin (1859–1924), English cricketer
- Brackin Karauria-Henry (born 1988), New Zealand rugby player

== Brackins ==
- Bobby Brackins, American singer, songwriter, and record producer from California
- Charlie Brackins (1932–1991), American football player
- Craig Brackins (born 1987), American basketball player
- Johnny Brackins (born 2003), American long jumper
- Larry Brackins (born 1982), American football player
- Roger Brackins, American visual artist
- Tony Brackens (born 1974), American football player

== See also ==
- Bracken (disambiguation)
