= USS Sardonyx =

Patrol vessel of the United States Navy

History

United States
- Name: USS Sardonyx (PYc-12)
- Namesake: Sardonynx, a variant of Onyx
- Builder: Germania Werft
- Launched: 1928 as Queen Anne
- Acquired: 19 June 1941
- Commissioned: 16 August 1941
- Decommissioned: 3 January 1944
- Out of service: 17 July 1946
- Stricken: 29 October 1946
- Fate: Transferred to Maritime Commission and sold 10 July 1947
- Notes: Official No. — 228072 (yacht)

General characteristics Queen Anne (yacht)
- Tonnage: 475 GRT
- Length: 168 ft (51 m) (Between perpendiculars)
- Beam: 27 ft (8.2 m)
- Complement: 18 crew

General characteristics Sardonyx (PYc-12)
- Displacement: 640 tons
- Length: 186 ft (57 m)
- Beam: 27 ft (8.2 m)
- Draft: 10 ft 6 in (3.20 m)
- Propulsion: 2 diesel engines
- Speed: 12.5 knots
- Complement: 65
- Armament: Four 30 caliber machine guns. Two depth charge tracks.

USS Sardonyx (PYc-12), formerly the yacht named Queen Anne (1928), was a patrol boat in the United States Navy during World War II.

== Pre-War civilian service as a yacht ==
The Sardonyx was originally a steel-hulled yacht with diesel engines, designed by Cox and Stevens built in 1928 as the Queen Anne for Isaac Edward Emerson at the Germania-Werft shipyards in Kiel, Germany and registered with the U.S. official number 228072. On Emerson's death in 1931 the yacht was sold to Alexander Dallas Thayer.

According to United States Government publications from 1941, the USS Sardonyx was the sister ship to the USS Opal (PYc-8), formerly Irving T. Bush's and Marian Spore Bush's motor yacht Coronet; both yachts were built at the same yard in 1928.

== Sardonyx during the war years ==
The vessel was purchased by the Navy at New York on 19 June 1941. Immediately after acquiring the yacht, the Navy started converting the vessel for use as a coastal patrol boat. On 18 July 1941, the vessel was renamed Sardonyx, and on 15 August 1941, it was commissioned. Conversion was completed by mid-October 1941, and Sardonyx proceeded for duty to New London, under the National Defense Research Committee (NDRC). Sardonyx served in support of experiments on the varied applications of electronics and underwater sound to naval warfare.

In January 1942, Sardonyx shifted back to New York; but, after a brief yard period, she returned to New London and resumed her work for the NDRC and the Navy's Underwater Sound Laboratory. Decommissioned and placed in service on 3 January 1944, she remained based at New London, conducting operations for the Underwater Sound Laboratory and escorting submarines in the area, through the end of World War II and into 1946.

== After World War II ==
In the spring of 1946, Sardonyx was ordered inactivated; and, with the summer, she moved to New York, where she was placed out of service on 17 July 1946. Her name was struck from the Navy list on 29 October 1946; and on 10 July 1947, she was transferred to the Maritime Commission and sold.

== See also ==
- List of patrol vessels of the United States Navy
