= Horizon Science Academy Columbus High School =

Coordinates: 40.0622°N 82.9910°W

Horizon Science Academy High School
- 1070 Morse Rd, Columbus, OH 43229

Information
- Mascot: Hawk
- Team name: Hawks
- Website: http://hs.horizoncolumbus.org/

Horizon Science Academy Columbus High School (HSACHS) is a grades 9–12 public charter school managed by Concept Schools. It is located in Columbus, Ohio, United States. Founded in 1999, the school emphasizes STEM (science, technology, engineering, and mathematics) education, career and technical education pathways, and is designated as a STEM and STEAM school by the Ohio Department of Education. It has been recognized as a National Blue Ribbon School by the U.S. Department of Education in 2009 and 2012.

== Awards ==
Horizon Science Academy Columbus High School received National Blue Ribbon Awards from the U.S. Department of Education in 2009 and 2012.

== Notable alumni ==
- Roger Brackins, visual artist
- Harold Jones-Quartey, NFL player
