= USS Opal =

Patrol vessel of the United States Navy

- USS Opal (PYc-8) as yacht Coronet (1928) prior to World War II

History

United States
- Name: USS Opal (PYc-8)
- Namesake: Opal
- Builder: Germania Werft
- Launched: 1928 as Coronet
- Acquired: 27 January 1941
- Commissioned: 10 June 1941
- Decommissioned: September 1943
- Out of service: 1943. Transferred to Ecuador under Lend-Lease.
- Stricken: 7 June 1949
- Fate: Sold to Ecuador 13 May 1949

History

Ecuador
- Name: BAE Manabi
- Namesake: Manabí Province, Ecuador
- Acquired: 13 May 1949
- In service: 1943 under Lend-Lease
- Stricken: 1960
- Fate: Scrapped in 1960.

General characteristics
- Displacement: 590 tons
- Length: 185 ft 6 in (56.54 m)
- Beam: 27 ft (8.2 m)
- Draft: 11 ft (3.4 m)
- Propulsion: 2 diesel engines, 425 H.P. each
- Speed: 13 knots
- Complement: 50
- Armament: Two 3" guns. Two depth charge tracks.

USS Opal (PYc-8), formerly the yacht named Coronet (1928), was a patrol boat in the United States Navy during World War II and then served in the Ecuadorian navy.

== 1928–1941: Yacht Coronet ==
Opal was originally designed by the naval architecture firm of Cox & Stevens as the steel-hulled motor yacht Coronet for American businessman Irving T. Bush. It was built in 1928 at Kiel, Germany by Germania Werft. This vessel was named after the smaller schooner yacht Coronet of 1885, built for Irving's father Rufus T. Bush and known for its victory in an 1887 transatlantic ocean race. The first Coronet was also the vessel upon which young Irving Bush and his family had sailed around the world in 1888. The new diesel-powered Coronet featured a library, a living room with an open fireplace, a dining room, six staterooms (each with its own bathroom), and space for a crew of 20. The yacht had a 7,000 mile range.

During the late 1920s and early 1930s, Coronet served as a pleasure yacht, for example cruising around the Mediterranean Sea and participating in New York Yacht Club activities on Long Island Sound.

From 1931 through the end of the 1930s, Coronet stayed in south Florida, in and near Miami, maintained and ready for service, yet inactive. In 1935, Bush transferred ownership of the yacht to his wife, Marian Spore Bush. As both husband and wife were officially residents of New York City, and the Coronet was registered in New York but kept in Florida, the yacht became the subject of a property taxation dispute, which was finally settled by the Florida Supreme Court in 1939.

== 1941–1943: Coastal Patrol Yacht USS Opal ==
Coronet was purchased by the United States Navy from M.S. Bush on 27 January 1941 and converted for naval service at Merrill-Stevens Drydock Co. in Miami, Florida. It was commissioned Opal on 10 June 1941.

Opal reported 23 August 1941 at Guantanamo Bay Naval Base, Cuba for service in the 10th Naval District. The vessel patrolled off Cuba and among the Greater Antilles prior to arrival at Trinidad, 24 April 1942, for similar "inshore patrol" duties. Early in October 1941 it sailed to the Charleston Navy Yard for installation of new sound detection equipment before returning to action against German submarines in the Caribbean Sea. Opal frequently served on escort missions between Guantanamo and Trinidad during the first eight months of 1943.

== 1943–1960: Ecuadorian Navy's Manabi ==
In 1943, the US Navy reassigned Opal to serve as a training ship for Ecuadorian naval crews. It was lent to Ecuador on 23 September 1943 under the Lend-Lease Program and renamed Manabi. The United States sold the vessel to Ecuador on 13 May 1949 and the US Navy struck its name from the Navy List on 7 June 1949. The Ecuadorian Navy scrapped the vessel in 1960.

== See also ==
- List of patrol vessels of the United States Navy
