= Manabí =

Word Manabí can refer to:

- Manabí Province
- Manabí (tribe)
- The manga and anime series Gakuen Utopia Manabi Straight! or the nickname of its main character Manami Amamiya.
- Manabi, a vessel of the Ecuadorian Navy (1943-1960), formerly the USS Opal (PYc-8)
