= Bracken House =

Bracken House may refer to:

- Bracken House, Ball State University
- Bracken House, London
