= Irving T. Bush =

American industrialist (1869–1948)

Irving Ter Bush
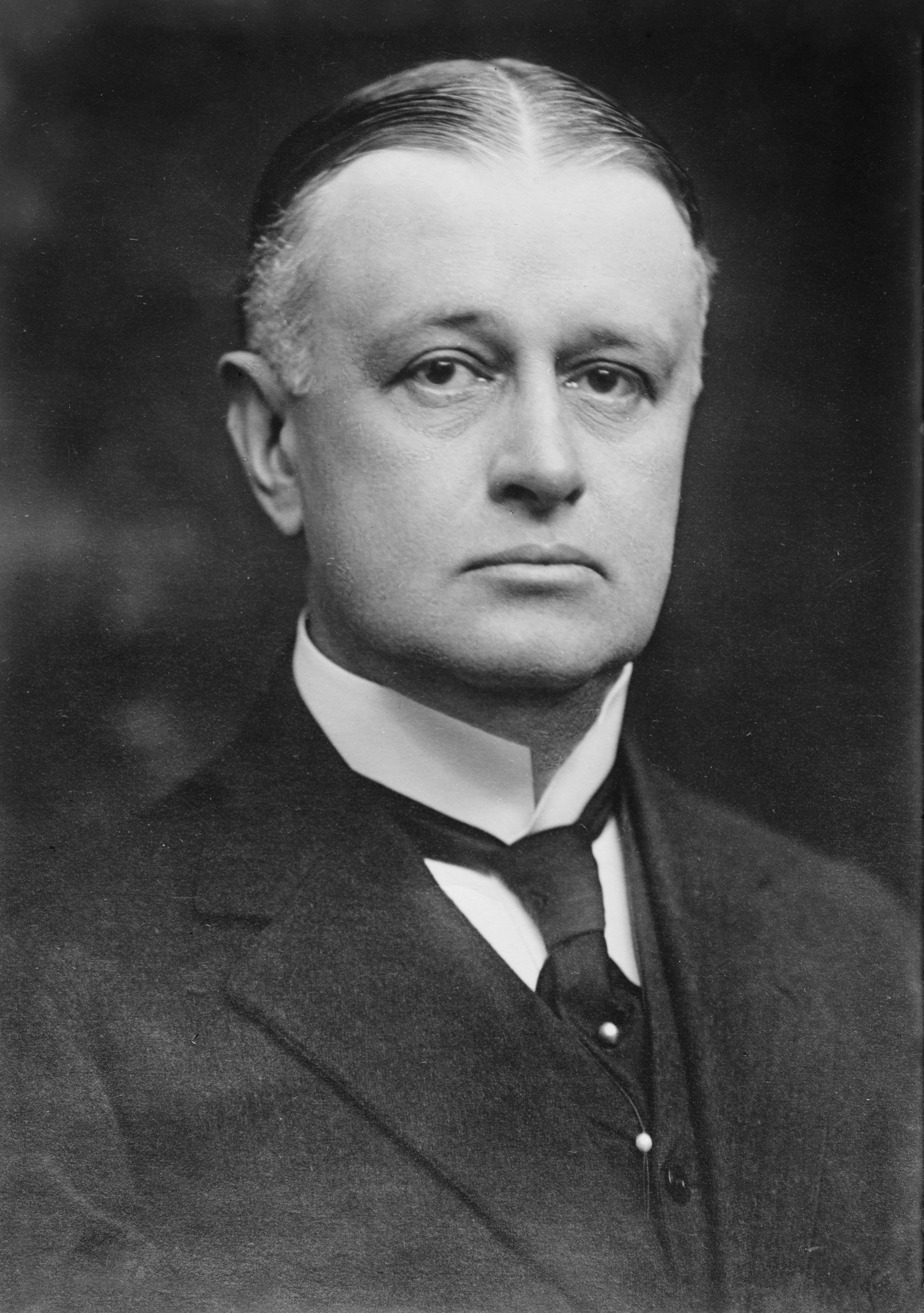
- Irving T. Bush, founder of Bush Terminal, Bush Tower, and Bush House
- Born: July 12, 1869; Ridgeway, Lenawee County, Michigan, U.S.
- Died: October 21, 1948 (aged 79); New York City, New York, U.S.
- Occupation: Business
- Spouses: Belle Barlow; Maud Howard Beard; Marian Spore Bush
- Parent(s): Rufus T. Bush; Sarah M. (Hall) Bush

Irving Ter Bush (July 12, 1869 – October 21, 1948) was an American businessman. He was the son of the wealthy industrialist, oil refinery owner, and yachtsman Rufus T. Bush.

As founder of the Bush Terminal Company, Bush was responsible for the construction of the massive Bush Terminal transportation, warehousing, and manufacturing facility in Sunset Park, Brooklyn, New York City, which employed more than 25,000 people within its boundaries. Bush also commissioned Manhattan's landmark Bush Tower skyscraper on 42nd Street near New York City's Times Square and funded the construction of Bush House in London. A prolific author, his life and works attracted attention from the national press, influential figures, and major publishers and journalists.

== Early life ==
Irving T. Bush's family name comes from Jan Bosch, a native of the Netherlands, who immigrated to New Amsterdam (now New York) in 1662.

== Early years ==
Born in Ridgeway, Lenawee County, Michigan, a small town southwest of Detroit, Bush moved with his family at a young age to Brooklyn, New York, at the time an independent city. When he was in his teens, his father sold his Brooklyn waterfront oil refinery to Standard Oil and retired. Bush was educated at The Hill School, a boarding school outside Philadelphia, and joined his father's firm at age 19.

The two-masted schooner yacht Coronet, a 136-foot (41 m) vessel that Rufus had built during the mid-1880s, influenced Irving's life, for the ocean race between the Coronet and the yacht Dauntless in March 1887 made Rufus T. Bush and the victorious Coronet famous—the New York Times devoted its entire first page for March 28, 1887 to the story. Rufus and Irving then circumnavigated the globe on the Coronet in 1888. Though they traveled overland and did not join the yacht until it arrived in San Diego in 1889, the Coronet was the first registered yacht to cross Cape Horn from East to West. After crossing the Pacific Ocean, the Coronet stopped in China, Calcutta, Malta (and elsewhere), giving him a view of the world that few had at the time. The Coronet was sold before Rufus's death in 1890, when Rufus accidentally drank a fatal dose of aconite. Rufus T. Bush left an estate estimated at $2,000,000 to his wife and two sons. The family heirs quickly incorporated under the name The Bush Co. Bush, as a 21-year-old clerk for Standard Oil, could have lived off his inherited wealth and retired from the business life.

== Motion pictures ==
Bush was chair of the Continental Commerce Co., which had exclusive rights to market Thomas Edison's Kinetoscope overseas. The kinetoscope was the earliest motion picture viewer. Unlike later movie projectors, kinetoscopes could show a moving image to only one person at a time. The Continental Commerce Co. opened the first licensed European kinetoscope parlor in London in 1894.

== Bush Terminal ==
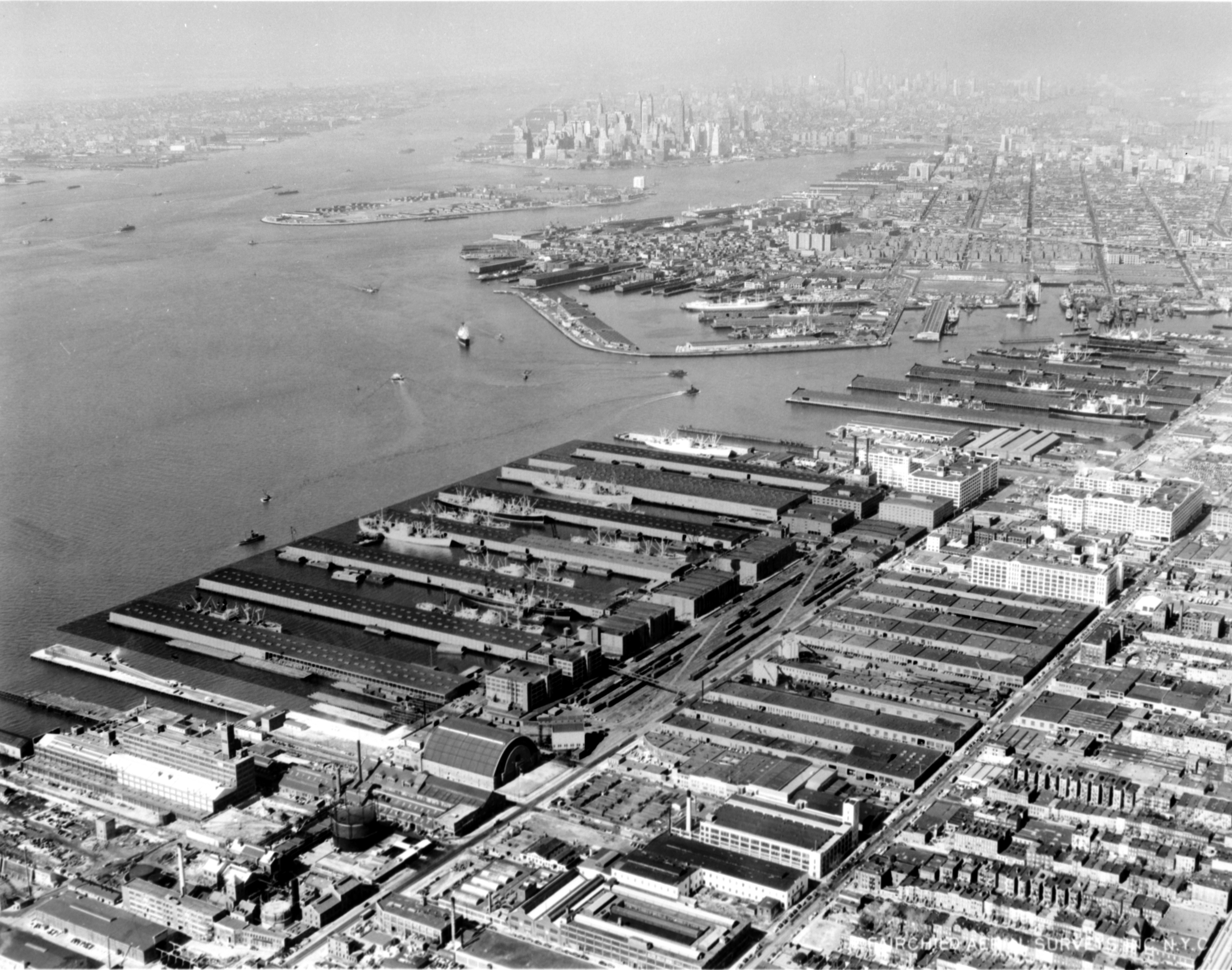
Bush Terminal in New York City was the largest industrial facility of its kind, with over 40 miles of railroad track that could handle up to 50,000 freight cars at a time

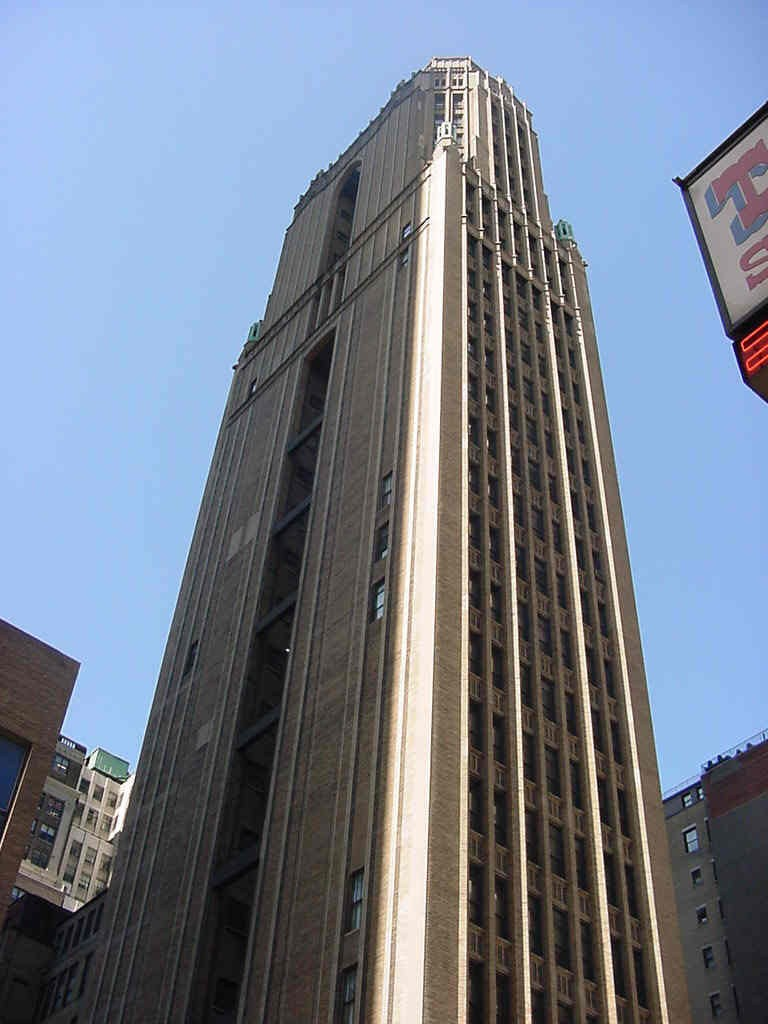
Bush Tower, a pioneering skyscraper in Midtown Manhattan, designated on the National Register of Historic Places and as a New York City Landmark

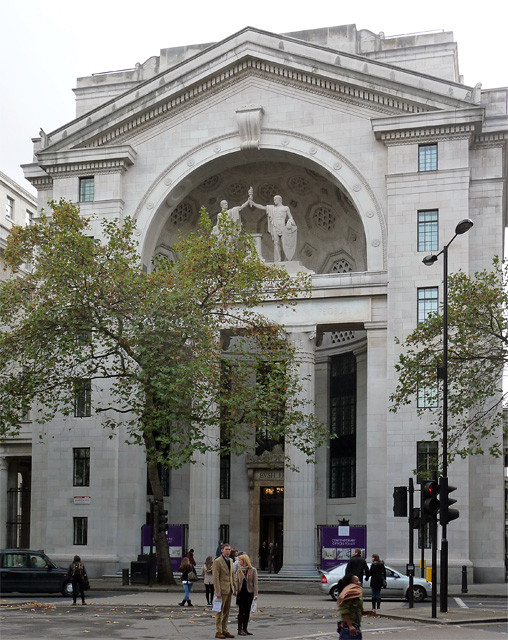
Bush House, originally an international trade center, and at the time of its construction the most expensive building in the world

Bush's connection with Edison's motion pictures was brief. Soon after, during the mid-1890s, Bush started the planning and construction of Bush Terminal on the Brooklyn waterfront site where his father's former oil refinery had been located.

To induce railroads to use his car floats, (i.e. using the barges that transported railroad cars across New York Harbor), Bush had to resort to ordering dozens of carloads of hay from Michigan himself. To show shippers that using the wharves and warehouses at the new terminal could be profitable, Bush entered the banana business. Within two decades, the complex originally derided as "Bush's Folly" became a great success. Though the complex was seized for government use during the First World War by Assistant Secretary of the Navy Franklin D. Roosevelt, Bush complied with government demands. He even helped to design the Brooklyn Army Terminal for General Goethals in 1918.

Bush was named Chief Executive of the War Board of the Port of New York in 1917, during World War I. This would later become the Port Authority of New York and New Jersey.

During this period before and during World War I, Bush planned and had built Bush Tower, a landmark 30-story Neo-Gothic skyscraper on 42nd Street in Manhattan, just east of Times Square. The tower was conceived as display space for the manufacturers and shippers of Bush Terminal and New York. An even more ambitious venture was Bush's attempt to meld commercial displays and social space in London at Bush House, an elaborate and large office building built in three phases during the 1920s, but the concept was not fully carried through at that project. Bush House became known around the world as the headquarters of the BBC World Service, which broadcasts in many languages. The BBC moved out in 2012.

== New York State Chamber of Commerce ==
Bush served as president of the Chamber of Commerce of the State of New York from 1922 to 1924. Prior to holding that position, Bush served as the chairman of the executive committee in the Chamber of Commerce.

== In popular culture ==
Forbes, in its first, one-time "Rich List" of 1918 (before starting the annual Forbes 400 in 1982), cited Irving T. Bush "of Bush Terminal fame" as one of those "undoubtedly earning several million a year" and just less wealthy than the 30 wealthiest Americans on the list, along with William C. Durant, founder of General Motors and William Wrigley Jr., the chewing gum magnate and Chicago Cubs baseball team owner.

In 1917, B.C. Forbes also placed Bush alongside Elbert Henry Gary (the namesake of Gary, Indiana). Forbes named Bush within a brief list of notable American businessmen (including hotelier Ellsworth Milton Statler) who were examples of the type of businesspeople whose "industrious, diligent, vigilant foundation-laying" could lead to successful business enterprises.

Bush was frequently mentioned in newspaper and magazine articles and wrote a number of business-related stories of his own, including stories in Nation's Business, Harper's Weekly, and as president of the New York Chamber of Commerce, an article in Collier's. Doubleday published his autobiography, Working with the World, in 1928.

== Contributions to art and architecture ==
Within recent decades, scholarly architects have described and critiqued the buildings that Bush commissioned. Perhaps by way of expression of the Dutch ancestry of his family (and of New York), his 1905 townhouse at 28 East 64th Street in Manhattan, built by the firm of Kirby, Petit & Green, was "flamboyantly Jacobean, with a high, almost Flemish gable".

Bush commissioned southern California architect Wallace Neff to design his winter home at Mountain Lake Estates in Florida, near the residence (and later tower) of his father's former business partner, Edward W. Bok. Neff, who had recently been named "architect to the stars" by the Los Angeles Times, designed few houses outside California.

He also commissioned the landscape architect Frederick Law Olmsted Jr. to design the grounds of the Florida estate. Olmsted was known not only as the son of Central Park's designer, but among numerous other accomplishments, was notable for re-designing the White House grounds in 1930.

After moving from his townhouse at East 64th Street, Bush lived in the 17-floor tower at 280 Park Avenue, Manhattan, New York, designed by Warren and Wetmore, architects of Grand Central Terminal in New York City, Michigan Central Station in Detroit and the Royal Hawaiian Hotel in Honolulu.

Like other wealthy Americans, Bush collected art. His portrait painting of the Russian princess Maria Worontzova (a name anglicized as Vorontsov) by Franz Xaver Winterhalter was inherited by his niece, and was auctioned at Sotheby's in 2003. Bush's acquisition of a portrait of Henry VII by Jehan de Perreal, a work from the early 16th century, made the news in 1929.

In 1922 Bush became one of the founding trustees of New York City's Grand Central Art Galleries, an artists' cooperative established that year by John Singer Sargent, Edmund Greacen, Walter Leighton Clark, and others. Also on the board were the Galleries' architect, William Adams Delano; Robert W. DeForest, president of the Metropolitan Museum of Art; Frank Logan, vice-president of the Art Institute of Chicago; and Clark.

== Personal life ==
Bush was in the news from a young age, when he was mentioned in stories of the Coronet's circumnavigation. He married Belle Barlow, with whom he had two daughters, Eleanor and Beatrice. Divorcing her, he married Maud Beard and had one son, Rufus, named after Irving's father.

His 1930 divorce in Reno, Nevada, and remarriage one hour later to dentist, artist, socialite, and philanthropist Marian Spore Bush made the front page of The New York Times as well as the "Milestones" section of Time magazine. Irving had met Marian, a fellow Michigan expatriate, when they worked together on a breadline in New York City's impoverished Bowery during the late 1920s. After their marriage they lived at 280 Park Avenue along with Mrs. Marian Spore Bush's niece Helen Tunison, who after Irving's death, dedicated the statue of him at Bush Terminal in front of 3,000 people.

Bush owned two yachts that subsequently served as patrol boats in the United States Navy. In 1917, during World War I, the navy bought his 164-foot-long (50 m) steam yacht Christabel and commissioned the vessel as the USS Christabel (SP-162), which took part in at least two actions against German U-Boats and was credited with sinking one. (See Navy History website) A sailor even won a Medal of Honor during one of these engagements. His larger 185-foot-long (56 m) diesel yacht, Coronet, built for him in Germany in 1928 and placed under his wife's name during the Great Depression, was bought by the Navy during World War II and patrolled the Caribbean as the USS Opal (Pyc-8) before being transferred to Ecuador in 1943, where it was scrapped in 1960.

== Legacy ==
Bush left behind Bush Terminal, which not only provided a model for intermodal transportation, but it also provided employment for thousands and their families. His Bush Tower in Manhattan and Bush House in London are both landmarks.
