= Bush House =

Building in London, part of the Strand Campus of King's College London

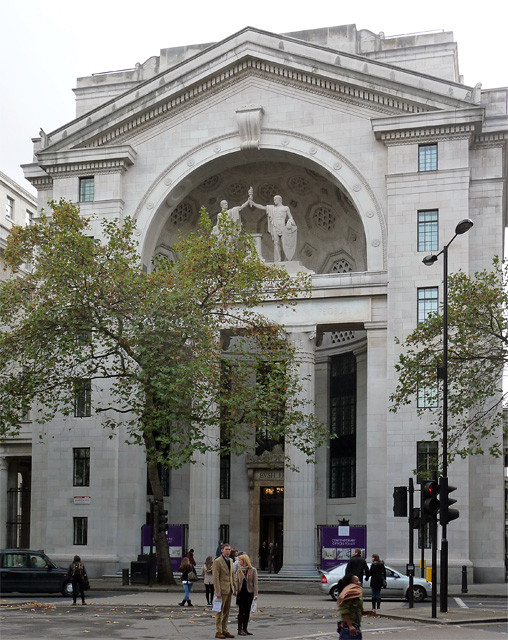
- Bush House viewed from Kingsway

- Location within Central London

General information
- Location: Aldwych, City of Westminster, London, United Kingdom
- Coordinates: 51°30′45.9″N 0°07′02.2″W
- Current tenants: King's College London
- Construction started: 1925
- Completed: 1935
- Owner: Kato Kagaku

Design and construction
- Architect: Harvey W. Corbett
- Designations: Grade II listed building

References
- OS grid TQ 307 810

"Bush House description"
Audio description of Bush House by Zoë Wanamaker

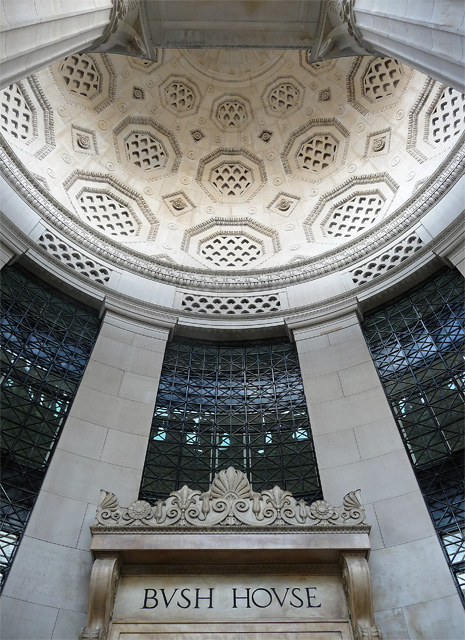
Detail of the exedra

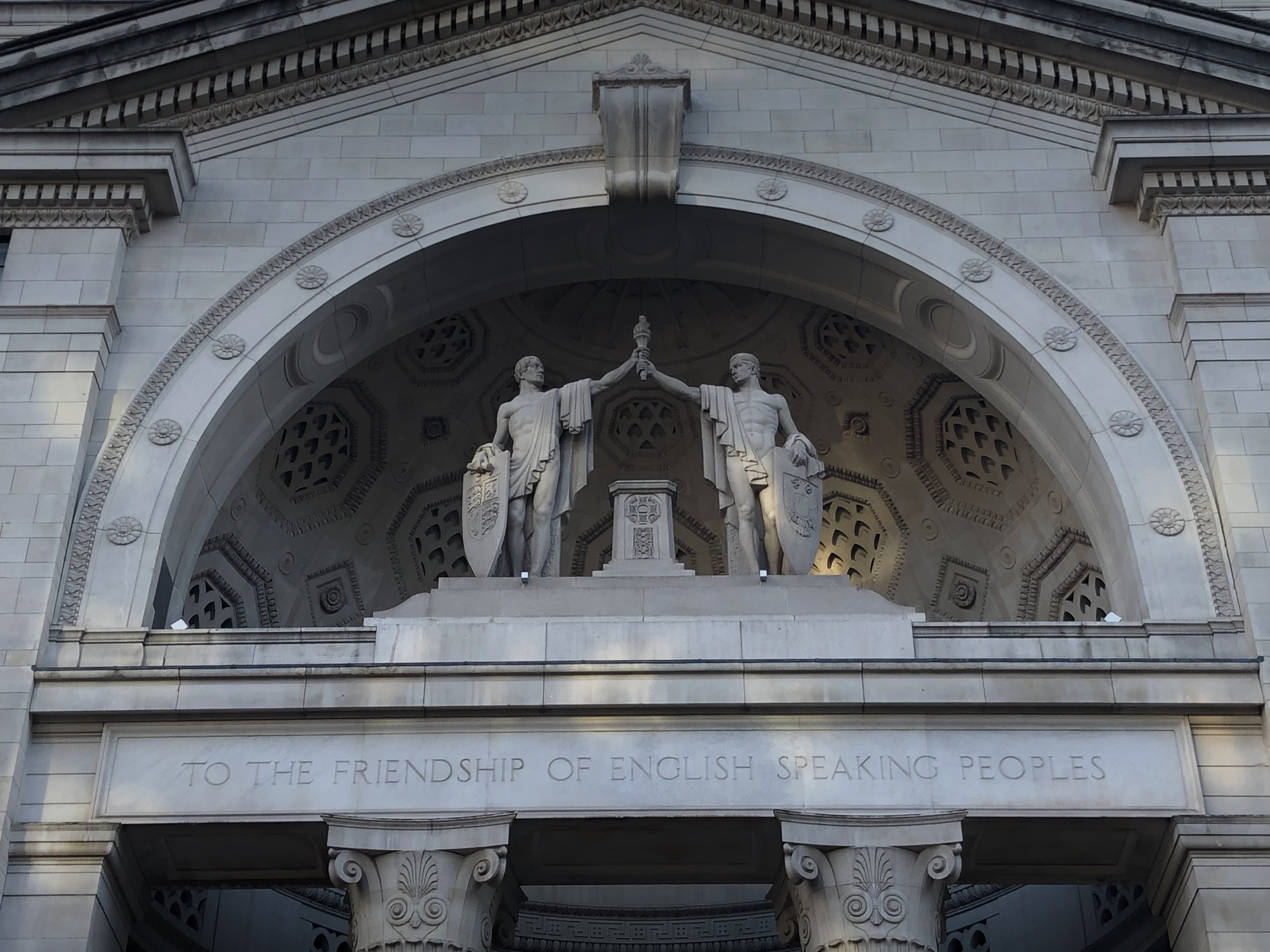
"To the friendship of English speaking peoples" monument

Bush House is a Grade II listed building at the southern end of Kingsway between Aldwych and the Strand in London, England. It was conceived as a major new trade centre by American industrialist Irving T. Bush, and commissioned, designed, funded, and constructed under his direction. The design was approved in 1919, work began in 1925, and was completed in 1935. Erected in stages, by 1929 Bush House was already declared the "most expensive building in the world".

Now part of the Strand Campus of King's College London, Bush House previously served as the headquarters of the BBC World Service. Broadcasting from Bush House lasted for 70 years, from winter 1941 to summer 2012. The final BBC broadcast from Bush House was the 12 noon BST news bulletin on 12 July 2012. The BBC World Service is now housed in Broadcasting House in Portland Place. King's College London has taken over the premises since acquiring the lease in 2015.

The longtime occupation of part of Bush House by HM Revenue and Customs (and its predecessor department the Inland Revenue) ended in March 2021 when it vacated the South-West Wing. This wing will also become a part of King's College London's Strand Campus, ensuring all wings of the building are now occupied by the University.

== History ==
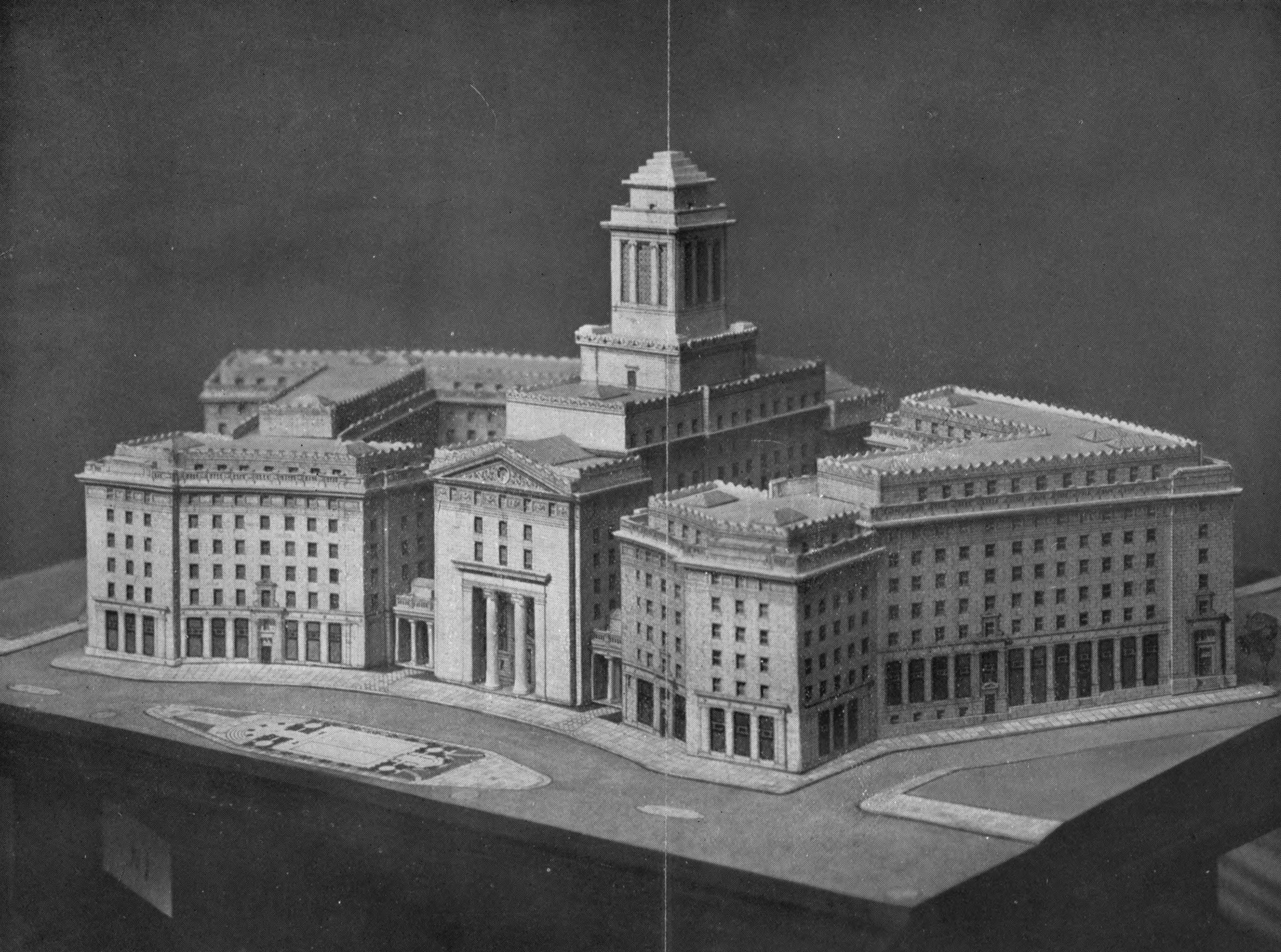
Architecture model of the building

The building was commissioned, designed and originally owned by American individuals and companies. Irving T. Bush gained approval for his plans for the building in 1919, which was conceived as a major new trade centre and designed by American architect Harvey Wiley Corbett. The construction was undertaken by John Mowlem & Co.

Sections of Bush House were completed and opened over a period of 10 years: Centre Block was opened in 1925, North-West Wing in 1928, North-East Wing in 1929, South-East Wing in 1930, and South-West Wing in 1935. The full building complex was completed in 1935.

The building's opening ceremony was performed by Lord Balfour, Lord President of the Council, on 4 July 1925. It included the unveiling of two statues at the entrance made by American artist Malvina Hoffman. The statues symbolise Anglo-American friendship and the building bears the inscription "To the friendship of English speaking peoples". Built from Portland stone, Bush House was in 1929 declared the "most expensive building in the world".

=== Headquarters of the BBC World Service ===
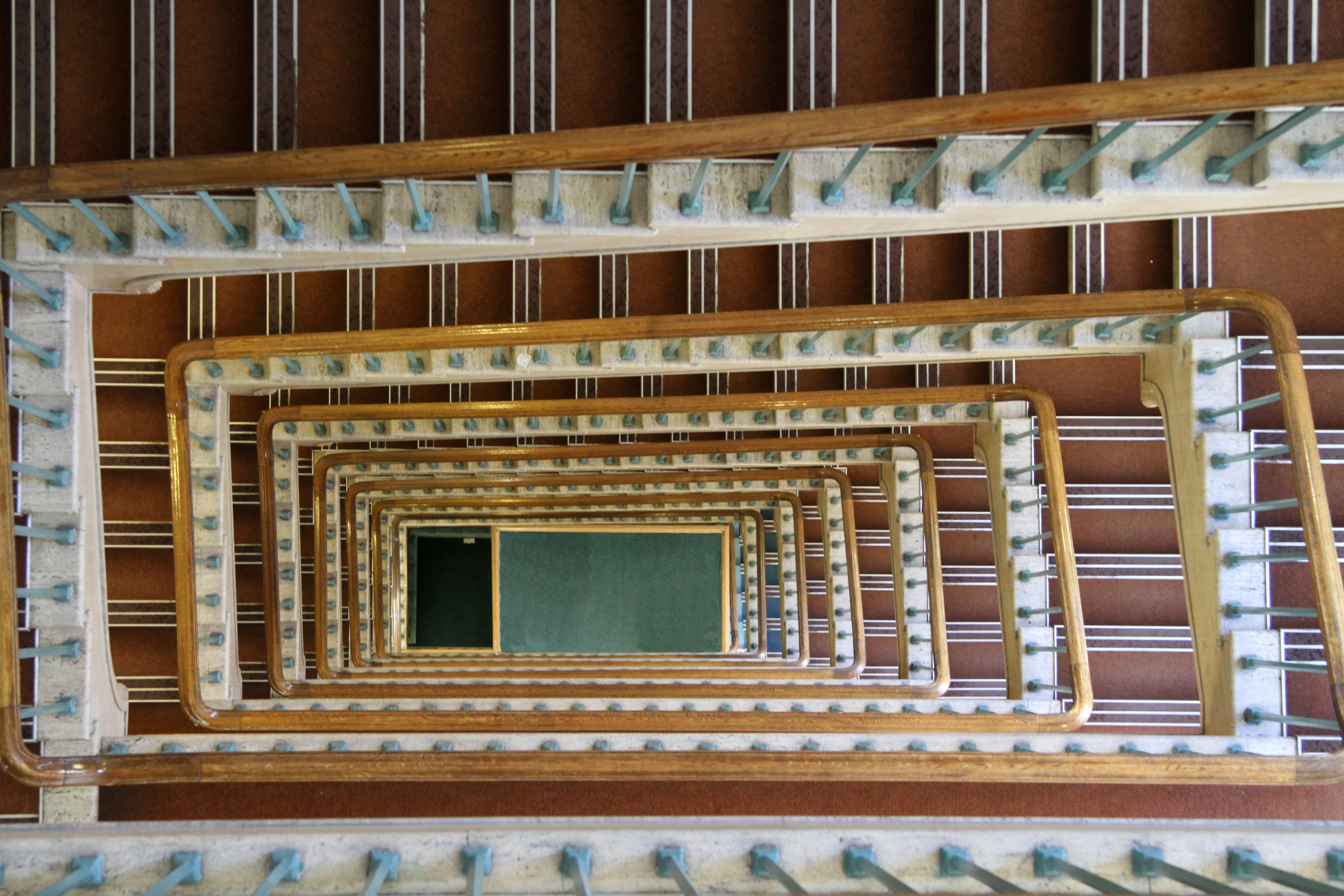
A stairway in Bush House

The BBC European Service moved into the South-East Wing of Bush House after bombs damaged Broadcasting House on 8 December 1940 during The Blitz. The move was completed in 1941 and the BBC Overseas Service followed in 1958. The BBC World Service occupied four wings of the building.

In 1944 Bush House suffered external damage from a V-1 flying bomb.

The North-West Wing was formerly occupied by BBC Online until it relocated to the BBC Media Village in 2005, with some studio and office space being retained until 2008. The BBC also moved its World Service to Broadcasting House. The final broadcast from Bush was on 12 July 2012. Bulletins now come from Broadcasting House.

BBC GLR 94.9fm - the Local BBC Radio station for London, moved to Bush House for 24 months in 1999, whilst its Marylebone High Street base was modernised. GLR used two continuity suites for their programmes: the 'new' Cons 4 and 6. These were 'spare' continuities, but a reduction in the number of networks meant they were rarely used until GLR moved in. Broadcaster Bob Mills humorously complained about having to work in a building called 'BVSH' House. GLRs production office, Newsroom and News Booth were located in Bush House North West Wing - this meant an up to 10 minute walk from the office to the studio. News bulletins were read from the newsbooth in North West Wing, a video feed between the Newsbooth and the main studios in centre block (Continuities 4 and 6) showed when the News reader was in their seat and ready to go. All area were linked by talkback/push-to-talk intercoms.

The BBC's lease expired at the end of 2012.

=== Refurbishment for King's College London ===
A full refurbishment of Bush House and its adjoining wings was undertaken by John Robertson Architects following the BBC's vacation. Bush House, along with North-East Wing, North-West Wing, South-East Wing and Melbourne House were stripped back to CAT A and fully modernised whilst retaining original period features. The intended use was open plan offices with reception spaces for each of the buildings given an individual identity. The courtyard was to remain as a car park/delivery point. This work was completed in June 2014 as part of the Aldwych Quarter.

On 10 March 2015, King's College London announced it had acquired a 50-year lease for the Aldwych Quarter as a substantial part of its expansion of its Strand Campus. John Robertson Architects undertook the interior fit-out to convert Aldwych Quarter into a fully operational, modern university campus, including installation of a 400-seat auditorium, lecture theatres, seminar rooms, academic offices, and a health centre. The courtyard was converted from car parking to semi-public realm and features a new glass pavilion offering access to the Students' Union and undercroft joining the building's wings together.

== King's College London campus ==
=== King's Business School ===
Since its foundation on 1 August 2017, the King's Business School has been located inside Bush House. It came forth from the School of Management and Business to form the 9th faculty of the university. The central block hosts the Department of Informatics, which brings together innovators from the business and technology worlds.

=== Students' Union ===
King's College London Students' Union (KCLSU) also occupies Bush House. Its Union Shop opened in The Arcade in September 2017, followed by a series of other student spaces in Spring 2018. KCLSU represents all students at King's, but operates as a charity, independent of the university.

=== School of Global Affairs ===
As of 2025 there are three departments (Geography, Global Health & Medicine, and International Development) and five global research institutes in the School of Global Affairs. The research institutes are focused on Africa, Australia, Brazil, China, and India.

==== Menzies Australia Institute ====
The Menzies Australia Institute is an academically-independent interdisciplinary research institute focused on Australia and its global connections. Named after the longest-serving Prime Minister of Australia, Sir Robert Menzies (1894-1978), the institute was founded in 1982 as the Australian Studies Centre in the Institute of Commonwealth Studies, part of the University of London, funded by the Menzies Memorial Trust and the Australian Government. Historian Geoffrey Bolton was the inaugural head of the institute.

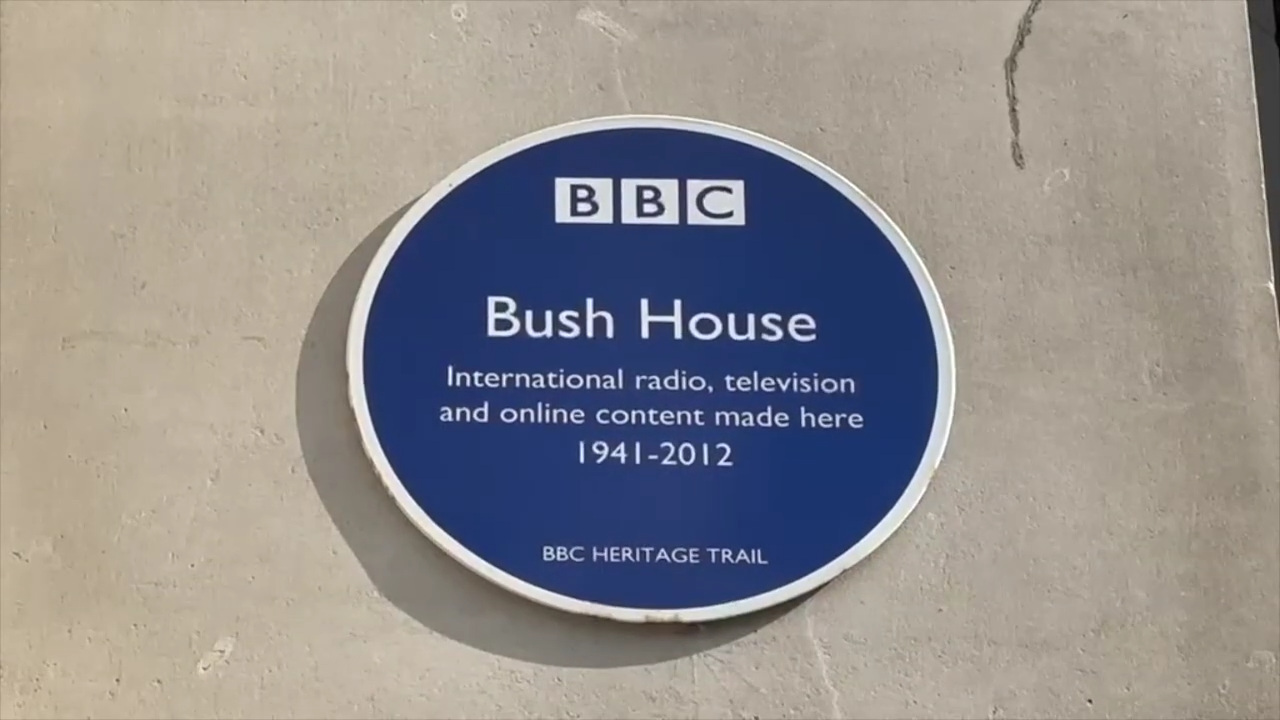
Farewell Bush House

1941-2012 sign

In 1999 the institute was moved to King's College London and renamed the Sir Robert Menzies Centre for Australian Studies.

== See also ==
Related buildings:

- Bush Terminal
- Bush Tower

Related persons:

- Marian Spore Bush
- Rufus T. Bush
