= John Robertson Architects =

British architectural firm established in 1993

John Robertson Architects (JRA) is an architectural practice based in Bankside, London, which was founded by its Director John Robertson in 1993. The practice concentrates on the design and implementation of new build, retrofit, historic refurbishment and restoration projects in Central London. It is a member of the AJ100, consisting of the 100 largest architecture practices in the UK. JRA is a foundation member of the Landaid Appeal.

== Selected projects ==
- Bloom Clerkenwell, Farringdon Oversite Development, EC1
- 101 Moorgate, Liverpool Street Crossrail Oversite Development, EC2
- BankMed HQ, Beirut, Lebanon
- 10 Park Drive, London E14
- Bracken House, London EC4
- Bush House, London WC2
- 33 King William Street, London EC4
- 51 Moorgate, London EC2
- Great Arthur House, Golden Lane Estate, London EC1
- Academy House, 161-167 Oxford Street, London W1
- King's College London, Bush House Campus, London WC2
- Bureau, 90 Fetter Lane, London EC4
- Minds pace Aldgate, London E1
- Daily Express Building, London EC4
- 199 Bishopsgate, Broadgate Estate, London EC2
- NEO Bankside, London SE1

== Exhibitions ==
- #johnremembers - A Personal View of London's Architecture, held at Dream space Gallery in 2017
- Smart Green Spaces, held at The City Centre in 2017
- Unfolding City, held at 111 Southward Street in 2015
- Building on the Past, Shaping the Future, held at Bankside Gallery 2013
- The Developing City 2050, held at Walbrook House in 2012

== Awards ==
John Robertson Architects has been shortlisted for numerous awards including:

- 2015 - Shortlisted NEO Bankside with Rogers Stirk Harbour + Partners, Stirling Prize
- 2015 - Shortlisted for Aldwych Quarter, Best Refurbished Building, MIPIM Awards
- 2016 - Shortlisted for Fastest Growing Practice of the Year, AJ100 Awards
- 2016 - Shortlisted for WeWork Spitalfields, British Council for Offices Awards
- 2017 - Winner Bracken House, Conservation and Retrofit unbuilt project of the year, NLA Awards
- 2017 - Shortlisted for The Pepper Store, Devonshire Square, AJ Retrofit Awards
- 2018 - Shortlisted for Academy House, Conservation and Retrofit, NLA Awards
- 2018 - Winner for 33 King William Street, Project of the Year, Graphisoft
- 2018 - Shortlisted for King William Street, Sustainable Practice of the Year, AJ100 Awards
- 2019 - Winner for Great Arthur House, RIBA National Awards
- 2019 - Winner for Great Arthur House, RIBA London Awards
- 2019 - Winner for Academy House, Facades and Cladding, AJ Specification Awards
- 2019 - Winner BREEAM/Future build Champions, BREEAM Awards
- 2019 - Winner for Bracken House, BIM Project of the Year, Graphisoft ARCHICAD Awards
- 2019 - Winner for Great Arthur House, Conservation and Retrofit, NLA Awards
- 2019 - Shortlisted for 33 King William Street and Bureau, 90 Fetter Lane, Architect of the Year: Offices, bd Awards
- 2019 - Shortlisted for Bureau, 90 Fetter Lane, Refurbished/Recycled Workplace, British Council for Offices Awards
- 2019 - Shortlisted, Sustainable Practice of the Year, AJ100 Awards
- 2019 - Shortlisted for Cannon Green, Mixed Use, NLA Awards
- 2019 - Shortlisted for Mind space, Workplaces, NLA Awards
