= Bracken (disambiguation) =

Bracken is a genus of ferns.

Bracken may also refer to:

== Places ==
- Bracken, Saskatchewan, Canada
- Bracken, East Riding of Yorkshire, a manor and hamlet in the East Riding of Yorkshire, England
- Bracken, Indiana, United States
- Bracken, Missouri, United States
- Bracken County, Kentucky, United States

== People ==
- Alexandra Bracken
- Bob Bracken (American football)
- Bob Bracken (settler), American settler and rancher
- Brendan Bracken
- Don Bracken
- Eddie Bracken
- Haley Bracken, Australian model and television personality
- Jack Bracken (baseball)
- James Bracken, songwriter and the co-founder and co-owner of Vee-Jay Records
- James E. Bracken American racehorse trainer
- John Bracken
- Josephine Bracken
- Kate Bracken
- Kyran Bracken
- Matthew Bracken
- Nathan Bracken
- Paul Bracken
- Peg Bracken
- Peter Bracken
- Raymond Bracken
- Thomas Bracken
- William Bracken

== Other ==
- Bracken (band), a post-rock band from Leeds, England
- Bracken (TV series), an Irish television soap opera
- Bracken, an enemy from the video game Lethal Company

== See also ==
- Bracken House (disambiguation)
