= James Sutherland Spore =

United States Navy officer (1885–1937)

Commander James Sutherland Spore
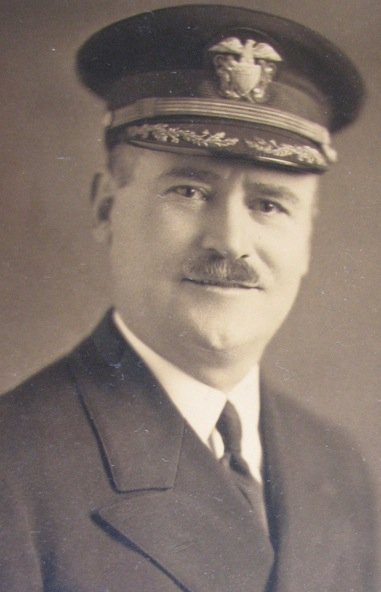
- Spore, US Navy Commander and Acting Governor

Acting Naval Governor of Guam
- In office February 27, 1921 – February 7, 1922
- Preceded by: Ivan Wettengel
- Succeeded by: Adelbert Althouse

Acting Governor of American Samoa
- In office March 24, 1931 – April 22, 1931

Personal details
- Born: May 13, 1885
- Died: April 28, 1937 (aged 51) La Mesa, California, US
- Spouse: Grace Walling Spore
- Children: 3
- Parents: Melvin Spore (father); Helen Spore (mother)
- Relatives: Marian Spore Bush (sister), Belle Spore Tunison (sister)
- Education: U.S. Naval Academy
- Known for: Acting Governor of Guam and American Samoa
- Military career
- Allegiance: United States of America
- Branch: United States Navy
- Rank: Commander

James Sutherland Spore (May 13, 1885 – April 28, 1937) was a commander in the United States Navy. He served as acting governor of Guam from February 27, 1921 to February 7, 1922 and as acting governor of American Samoa from March 24, 1931 to April 22, 1931.

James S. Spore grew up in Bay City, Michigan, and graduated from the U.S. Naval Academy with the nickname of "Wooden Willie." His sister was Marian Spore Bush and he had three children.

== Career ==
Spore served as acting Naval governor of Guam from February 27, 1921 to February 7, 1922.

Spore served as acting governor of American Samoa from March 24, 1931 to April 22, 1931.

As of 1933, he was stationed in San Pedro, California. After retiring from the Navy, he moved to La Mesa, California (in San Diego County) to farm avocados.

== Personal life ==
On April 29, 1916, Spore married Grace Walling at St. Andrews Episcopal Church in South Orange, New Jersey.

In 1937, Spore died in La Mesa, California. He was buried in Arlington National Cemetery.
