= Harold Jones-Quartey =

American football player (born 1993)

No. 29, 39, 21
- Position: Safety

Personal information
- Born: August 6, 1993 (age 33); Ghana
- Listed height: 5 ft 11 in (1.80 m)
- Listed weight: 210 lb (95 kg)

Career information
- High school: Horizon Science Academy (Columbus, Ohio, U.S.)
- College: Findlay
- NFL draft: 2015: undrafted

Career history
- Arizona Cardinals (2015)*; Chicago Bears (2015–2016); New York Jets (2017)*; Philadelphia Eagles (2017)*; Kansas City Chiefs (2019)*; St. Louis BattleHawks (2020)
- * Offseason or practice squad member only

Awards and highlights
- Super Bowl champion (LII)

Career NFL statistics
- Total tackles: 104
- Forced fumbles: 1
- Interceptions: 2
- Stats at Pro Football Reference

Harold Jones-Quartey (born August 6, 1993) is an American former professional football player who was a safety in the National Football League (NFL). He played college football for the Findlay Oilers and signed with the Arizona Cardinals as an undrafted free agent in 2015.

== Early life ==
Harold Jones-Quartey was born in Ghana in 1993, to Rosemond Odamitten and Emmanuel Jones-Quartey; he has four siblings. After his mother moved to the United States, he was raised in Ghana by his father and grandmother, until he rejoined his mother in Ohio at age 9.

== College career ==
Jones-Quartey attended and played college football at the University of Findlay. In 2011, he contributed as a wide receiver and had eight receptions for 120 yards and a touchdown. In 2012, he contributed on offense as a wide receiver and defense as a safety. He had 15 catches for 174 yards and recorded 40 tackles, one interception, which was returned 42 yards for a touchdown. In 2013, he had 92 tackles, three interceptions, nine pass deflections, and one forced fumble.

== Professional career ==
=== Arizona Cardinals ===
On May 11, 2015, Jones-Quartey signed with the Arizona Cardinals as an undrafted free agent following the conclusion of the 2015 NFL draft. He caught the attention of the Cardinals with his preseason performance against the Kansas City Chiefs. He made six tackles in that game and later, against the San Diego Chargers, intercepted backup quarterback Brad Sorensen. Despite a strong preseason, he was waived by the Cardinals on September 5, 2015.

=== Chicago Bears ===
On September 6, 2015, Jones-Quartey was claimed off waivers by the Chicago Bears. He recorded his first NFL career interception and forced fumble against the Tampa Bay Buccaneers on December 27, 2015. As a rookie, Jones-Quartey shined while making the third start of his career. His efforts helped the Bears win in their 26–21 victory over the Buccaneers. He posted four tackles, one interception, one forced fumble, and two passes defended. The interception was the lone red zone turnover by the Bears in 2015. Jones-Quartey then received a nomination for the Pepsi Rookie of the Week honors for Week 16.

On September 2, 2017, Jones-Quartey was waived by the Bears.

=== New York Jets ===
On October 18, 2017, Jones-Quartey was signed to the practice squad of the New York Jets. He was released on October 24, 2017.

=== Philadelphia Eagles ===
On November 14, 2017, Jones-Quartey was signed to the Philadelphia Eagles' practice squad. He was released on December 9, 2017. He was re-signed on January 9, 2018. With Jones-Quartey being on practice squad, the Eagles defeated the New England Patriots in Super Bowl LII.

=== Kansas City Chiefs ===
Jones-Quartey signed with the Chiefs on March 7, 2019. He was released on August 31, 2019.

=== St. Louis BattleHawks ===
Jones-Quartey was selected by the St. Louis BattleHawks of the XFL in the 2020 XFL Supplemental Draft on November 22, 2019. He had his contract terminated when the league suspended operations on April 10, 2020.

== NFL career statistics ==
Legend
**Bold**	Career high

Year	Team	Games		Tackles					Interceptions					Fumbles			
Year	Team	GP	GS	Cmb	Solo	Ast	Sck	TFL	Int	Yds	TD	Lng	PD	FF	FR	Yds	TD
2015	CHI	13	4	26	22	4	0.0	0	**1**	**23**	0	**23**	2	**1**	0	0	0
2016	CHI	**16**	**12**	**78**	**66**	**12**	0.0	**2**	**1**	0	0	0	**5**	0	0	0	0
		29	16	104	88	16	0.0	2	2	23	0	23	7	1	0	0	0
