= Rufus T. Bush =

American businessman

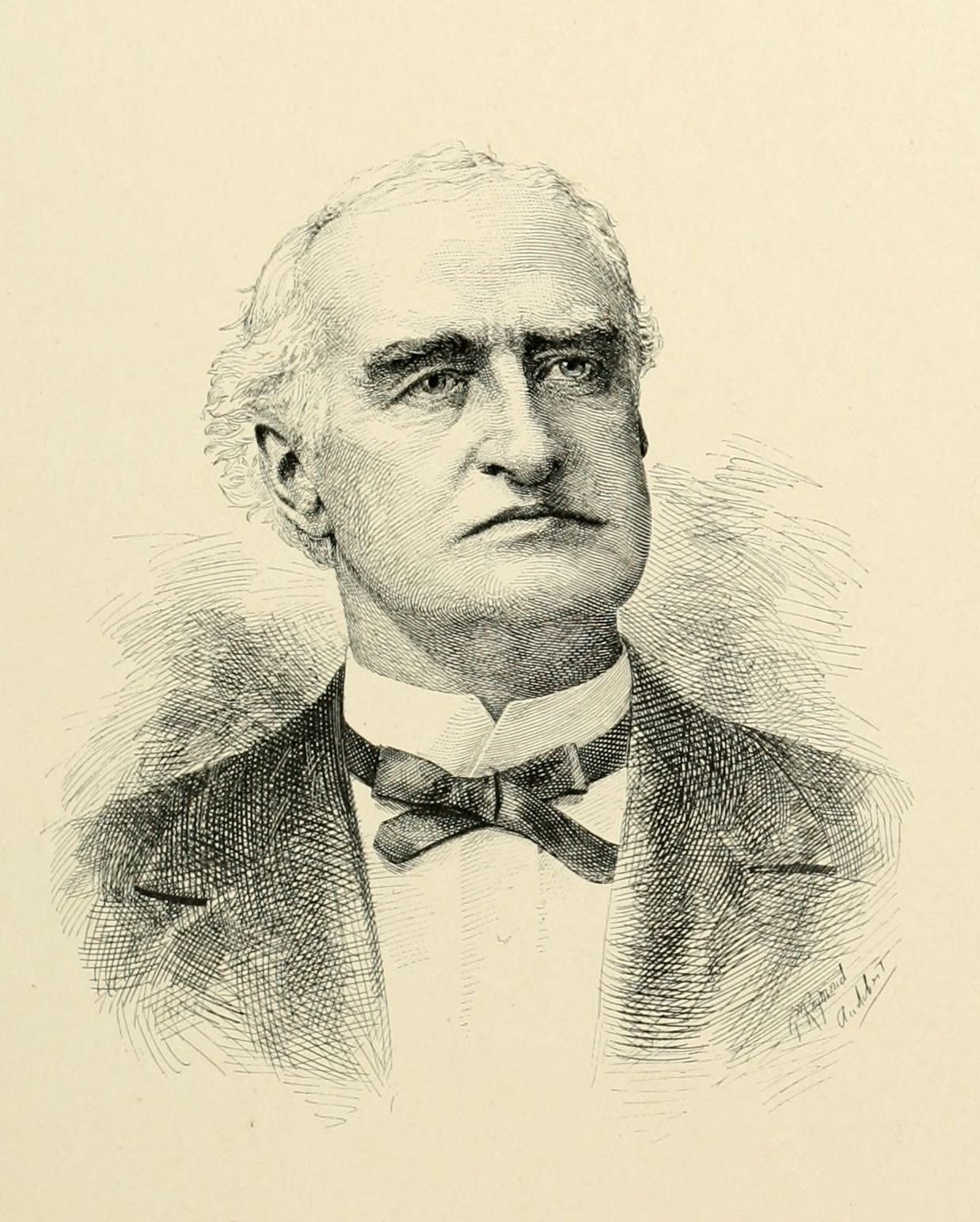
- Born: February 22, 1840; Tompkins County, New York, U.S.
- Died: September 15, 1890 (aged 50); New York City, New York
- Occupations: Business, Oil refining
- Spouse: Sarah Hall
- Children: Wendell Bush; Irving T. Bush
- Parent(s): Peter T. Bush; Phebe (Sutherland) Bush

Rufus Ter Bush (February 22, 1840 – September 15, 1890) was an American businessman, industrialist, and yachtsman. His notable testimony against Standard Oil's monopolistic practices through railroad rebates left a lasting impression, while the 1887 transatlantic ocean race of his sailing yacht Coronet and his subsequent circumnavigation on the same yacht evoked much interest in the national press.

Bush and his son Irving T. Bush are descended from Jan Bosch, a native of the Netherlands, who immigrated to New Amsterdam, now New York, in 1662. There is no known connection to the English-rooted family of Presidents George H. W. and George W. Bush.

== Early life ==
Rufus Ter Bush was born in Tompkins County, New York. He grew up on his father's farm, then moved to Michigan in 1851. After graduating from Lansing High School, and spending two years at the State Agricultural College (now Michigan State University) and graduating in 1861 from the Michigan State Normal School (now Eastern Michigan University) in Ypsilanti, he and his wife were schoolteachers for two years.

Bush started in business by selling sewing machines in Chicago. He briefly moved to Toronto, Ontario, Canada for the manufacture of machines before moving to New York City. He greatly profited by procuring the names and addresses of ministers around the United States and direct-mailing their congregations to sell wire laundry line.

== Oil and Standard Oil ==
After the laundry-line venture and other business enterprises, such as buying land in the mountains of Virginia, Bush turned to oil refining. He invested the new firm of Bush & Denslow, which had an operation on 25th Street in today's Sunset Park area of the South Brooklyn waterfront. The refinery was destroyed by fire in 1881 and rebuilt in Bay Ridge.

As co-owner of a smaller refinery, Bush publicly testified in 1879 against Standard Oil's practice of railroad rebates, stating that, "All the profit that the Standard Oil got, they out of the railroad in the form of rebates." Academic historians recently described Bush's testimony as notable for its "quotable accusations" that subsequently became a "cliché permanently included" in histories of Standard Oil. Muckraker Ida Tarbell published verbatim Bush's testimony concerning Standard Oil's hold over railroad lines and the effects of these discriminatory practices in her landmark book The History of the Standard Oil Company in 1904.

In spite of Bush's attacks, Bush & Denslow's Brooklyn refinery was sold to Standard Oil during the 1880s, allowing Bush to retire a very wealthy man. Standard Oil then dismantled it, having eliminated another competitor.

== The yacht Coronet ==
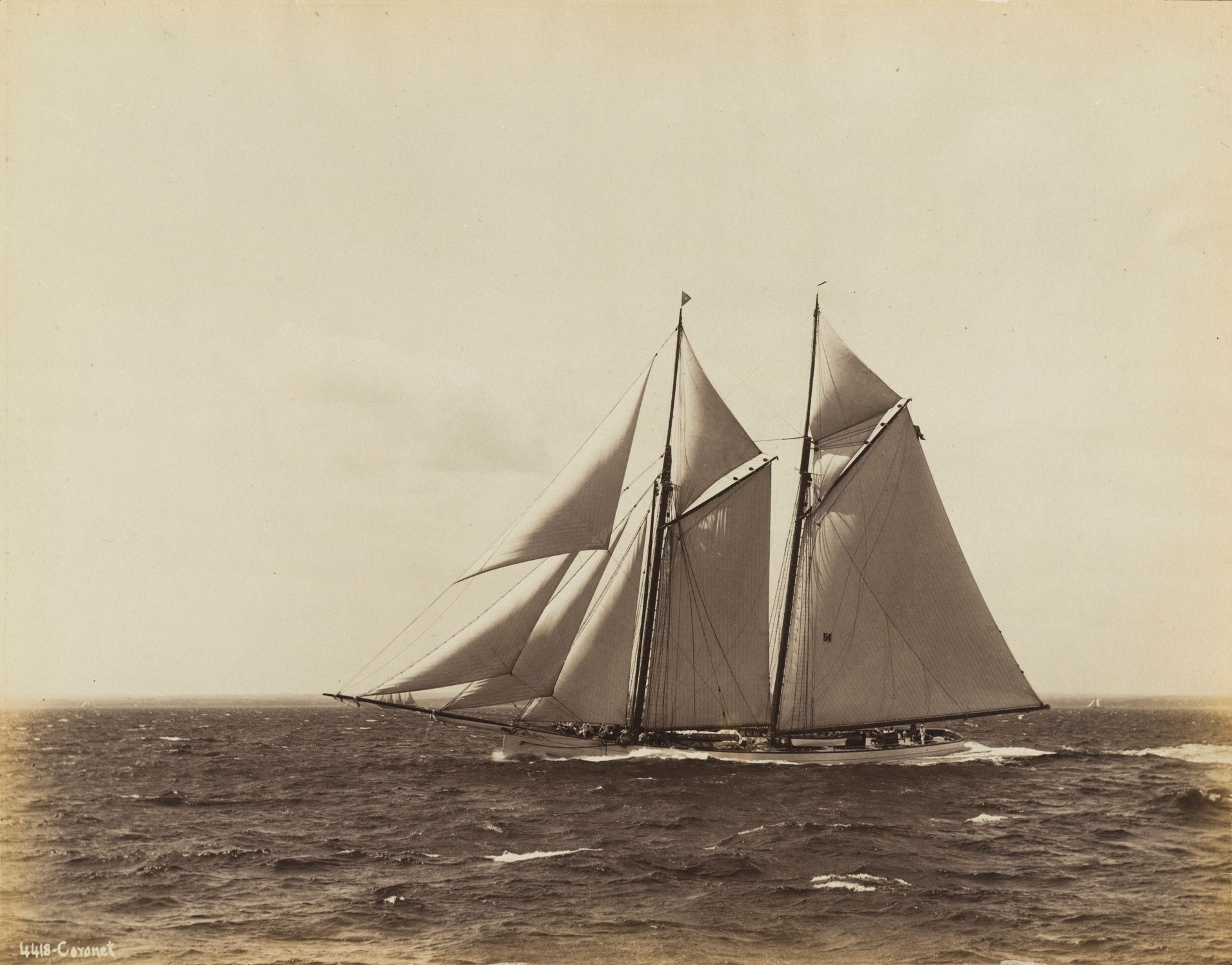
Coronet in race, 1893

Bush had owned a steam yacht in the 1880s. After retiring, he had a large and luxurious sailing yacht, the 131' Coronet, designed for him and built in Brooklyn. Bush put forth a $10,000 ($358,333 in 2025) challenge against any other yacht for a transatlantic race. The ocean race between the Coronet and the yacht Dauntless in March 1887 made Bush and the victorious Coronet famous—the New York Times devoted its entire first page for March 28, 1887 to the story.

After winning the 3,000-mile race and the $10,000 purse, Bush decided to sell the Coronet and listed the vessel in England for $30,000 ($1.08 million in 2025). Rufus and his family (including his son Irving T. Bush) then circumnavigated the globe on the Coronet in 1888, stopping in Hawaii, Japan, India, and elsewhere. The Coronet was sold before Rufus's death in 1890.

After passing through a succession of owners, the Coronet is currently being restored in, Mystic, Connecticut. It is the oldest registered yacht in the United States and is one of the last remaining grand sailing yachts from the nineteenth century. It retains its elaborate original interiors and is registered on the U.S National Register of Historic Places (#04000571).

== Personal life ==
Bush died on September 15, 1890, after accidentally taking a fatal dose of aconite. It is claimed he had been suffering from insomnia for months and been taking paregoric with whisky before retiring in the evening. Evidently he mistook the aconite for paregoric during the night, and was found dead in the morning. He left an estate estimated at $2,000,000 ($71.7 million in 2025) to his wife and two sons. The family quickly incorporated under the name The Bush Co.

== Legacy ==
Bush's fortune provided the necessary seed money for his son Irving T. Bush to start the construction of Bush Terminal on the waterfront site of the former Bush & Denslow refinery in Brooklyn during the 1890s. Among other contributions, the terminal funded construction of Bush Tower, a landmark skyscraper on famous 42nd St. next to Times Square in New York, as well as the building of Bush House, London, an elaborate office building that housed the BBC World Service from 1941 until July 2012.

Bush's yacht Coronet remains as one of the last remaining grand sailing yachts of the 19th century.

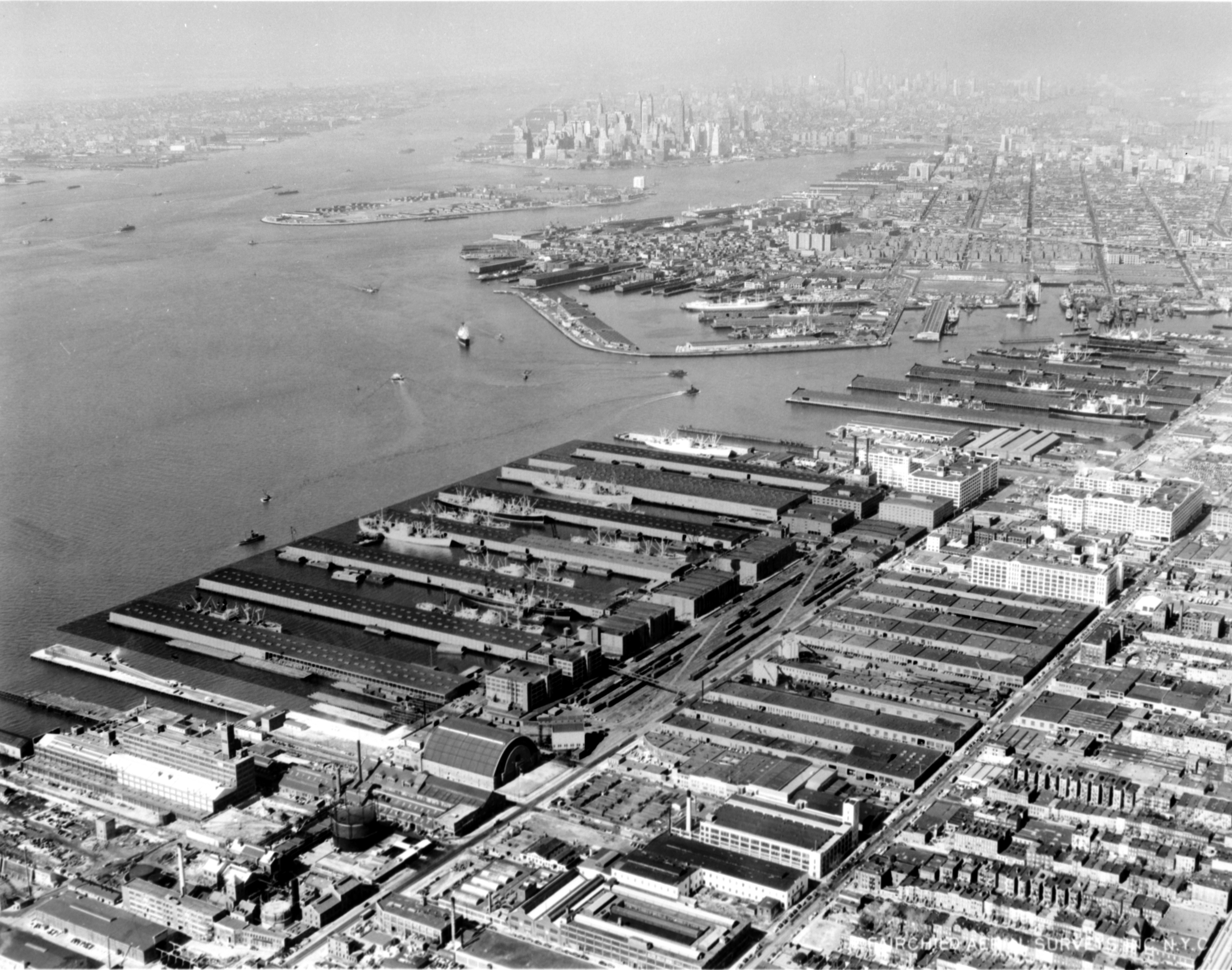
Bush Terminal in New York City was the largest industrial facility of its kind, with over 40 miles or railroad track that could handle up to 50,000 freight cars at a time

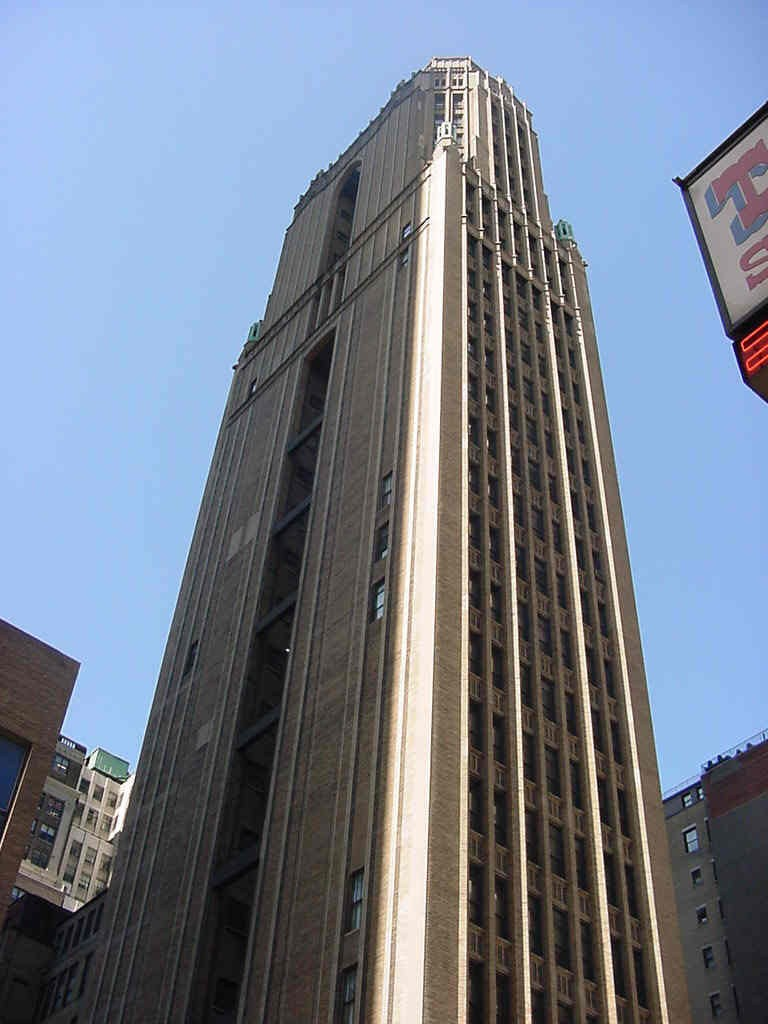
Bush Tower, a pioneering skyscraper in Midtown Manhattan, designated on the National Register of Historic Places and as a New York City Landmark

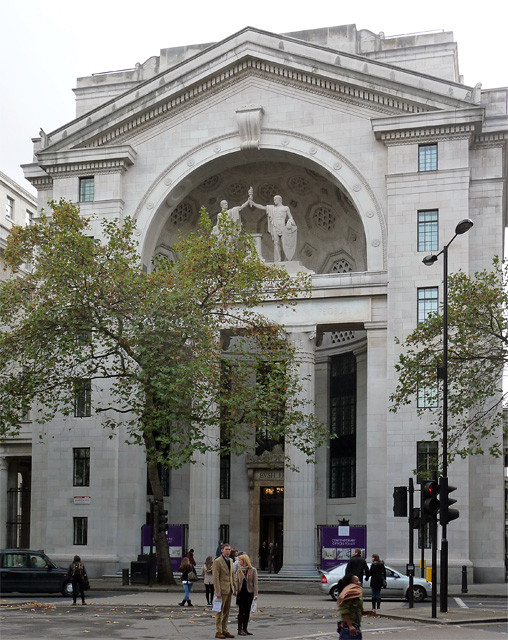
Bush House, originally an international trade center, and at the time of its construction the most expensive building in the world

The New York Times devoted the entire front page of its March 27, 1887, edition to Coronet's victory in its celebrated transatlantic race

== See also ==
- Standard Oil
- Coronet
- Irving T. Bush
