= Bracken House, London =

Building in London

Bracken House
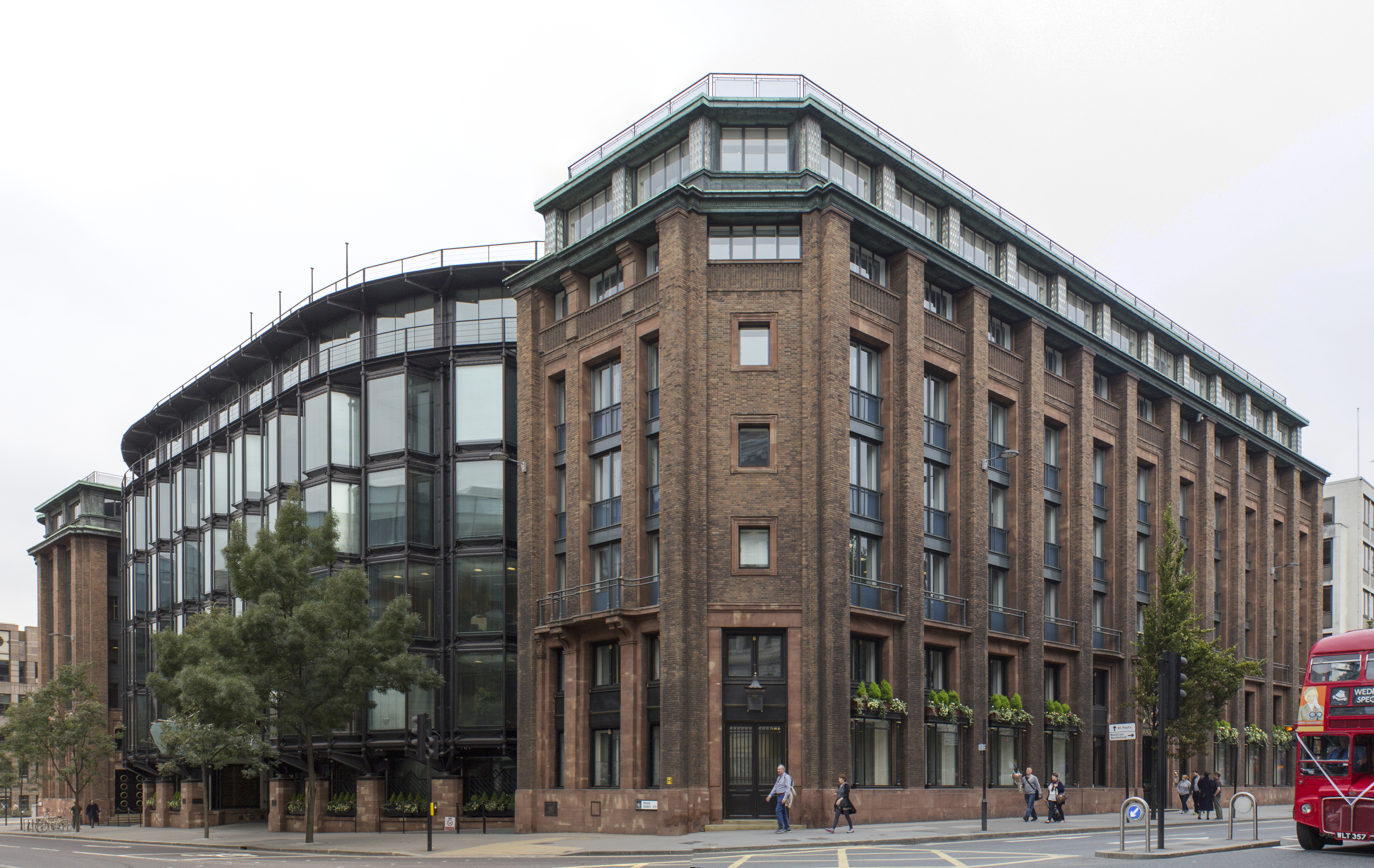
- The north and east façades, from the north-east, looking southwest
- Interactive map of the Bracken House area

General information
- Type: Office
- Location: 1 Friday Street, London, United Kingdom
- Coordinates: 51°30′45″N 0°05′47″W
- Current tenants: Financial Times

Technical details
- Floor count: 9

Other information
- Public transit access: District line from Mansion House

Listed Building – Grade II*
- Official name: Bracken House
- Designated: 13 August 1987
- Reference no.: 1262582

Bracken House is a building at 1 Friday Street and 10 Cannon Street in the City of London. It was the headquarters of the Financial Times newspaper until the 1980s, and again from May 2019. A late example of modern classicism, it was designed by Sir Albert Richardson and constructed on a cleared bomb site southeast of St Paul's Cathedral.

The central part of the building was redesigned by Michael Hopkins and Partners between 1988 and 1992. After refurbishments by John Robertson Architects, the Financial Times moved back into Bracken House in spring 2019.

It became a Grade II listed building in 1987 – the first building built in England after the Second World War to become listed – and was upgraded to Grade II* in 2013.

== History ==
=== 20th century ===
New offices were required for the Financial Times after it merged with the Financial News in 1945. The building was named after Brendan Bracken, who became Viscount Bracken in 1952.

The building was clad in pink sandstone from Hollington, Staffordshire, as an allusion to the characteristic pink colour of the newspaper, with red bricks and bronze windows, contrasting with the verdigris of the copper roof. Editorial offices were located in the northern range, beside Cannon Street, with printing machinery in an octagonal structure in the centre between Friday Street and Distaff Lane, and more offices to the south, by Queen Victoria Street.

Above the entrance on Cannon Street is an astronomical clock, designed by Frank Dobson and Philip Bentham and made by Thwaites & Reed. The clock features the face of Winston Churchill at the centre of a large gold sunburst, Churchill having been a great friend of Viscount Bracken during the war.

Like other newspapers, the Financial Times moved out of central London in the 1980s, and the printing works closed in 1988. The building was sold by Pearson in 1987.

In August 1987, Bracken House became one of the first post-war buildings in England to become a Listed Building, in works such as Lord Foster's Willis Faber and Dumas Building, Ipswich, England of 1975, to prevent it being demolished and replaced by a new glass and steel building proposed by Michael Hopkins and Partners, the post-war Brynmawr Rubber Factory was listed in 1985 by the Welsh Office. The plans were changed to incorporate the old building, redeveloped by Obayashi Corporation between 1988 and 1992.

The altered building retained the old ranges to the north and south, but replaced the central printing hall with a new glass and structural gunmetal structure on a Hollington sandstone plinth, with boxy oriel windows inspired by Oriel Chambers in Liverpool, constructed in 1864.

=== 21st century ===
With its main entrance now at 1 Friday Street to the east, the building was altered to include large open offices and trading floors for the European head office of the Industrial Bank of Japan, which combined with Dai-Ichi Kangyo Bank and Fuji Bank in 2002 to form Mizuho Financial Group, the third-largest bank in Japan. The Hopkins additions were included in the Grade II* listing in 2013.

In 2019, the Financial Times relocated from its offices at Southwark Bridge back to Bracken House.

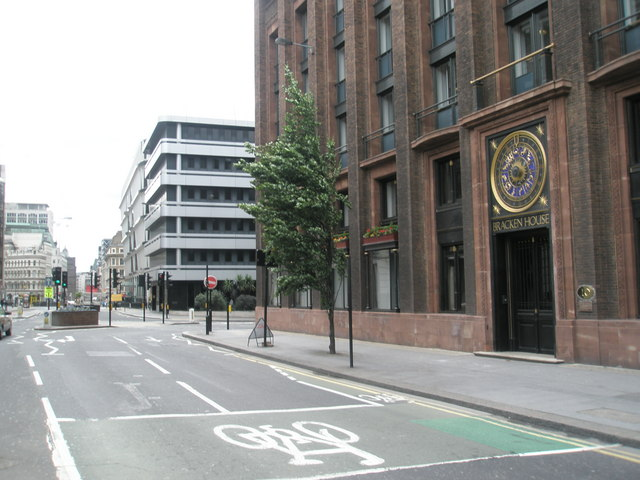
Looking east along Cannon Street

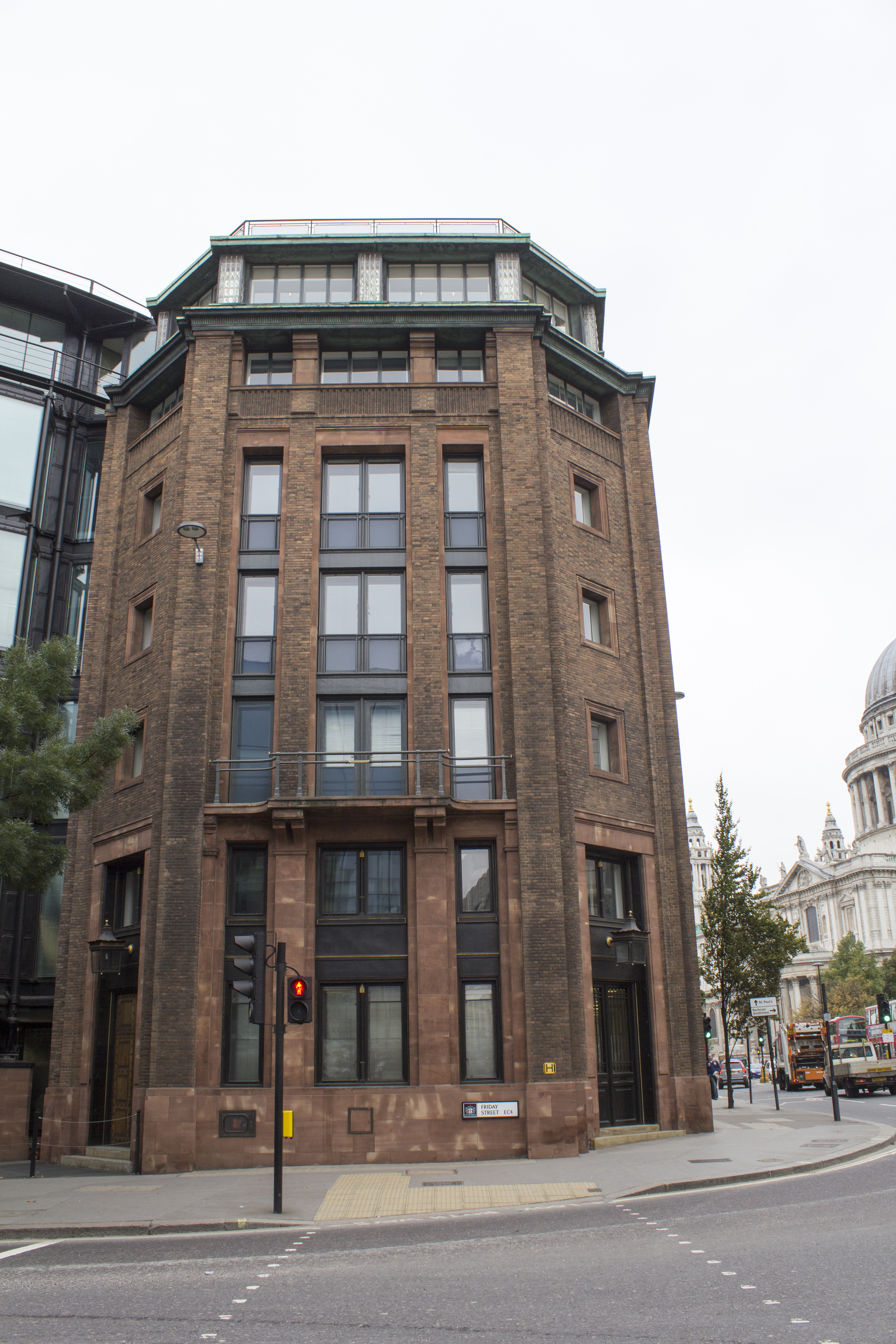
North east corner, where Friday Street meets Cannon Street

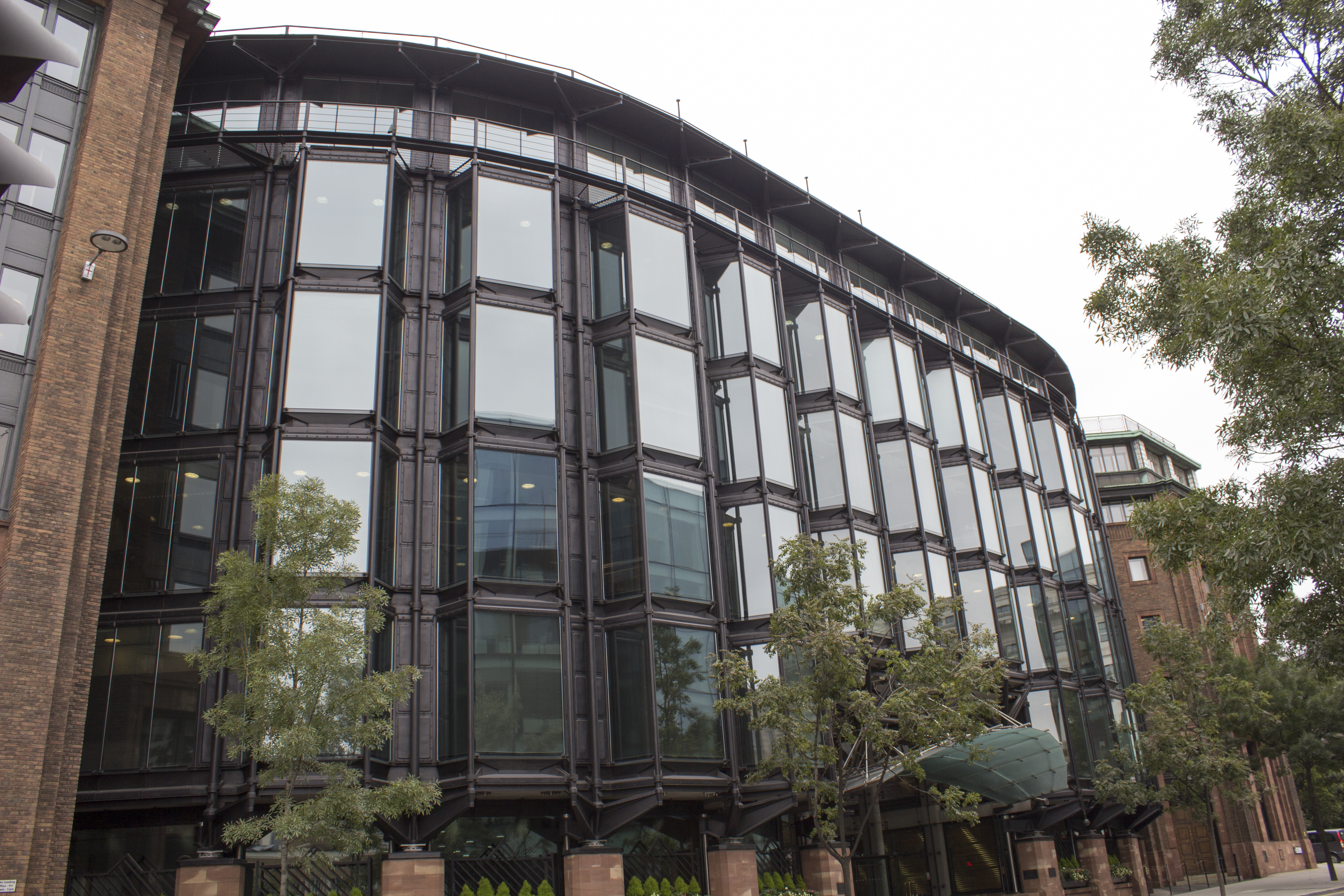
The east façade on Friday Street, from the south-east, looking north-west

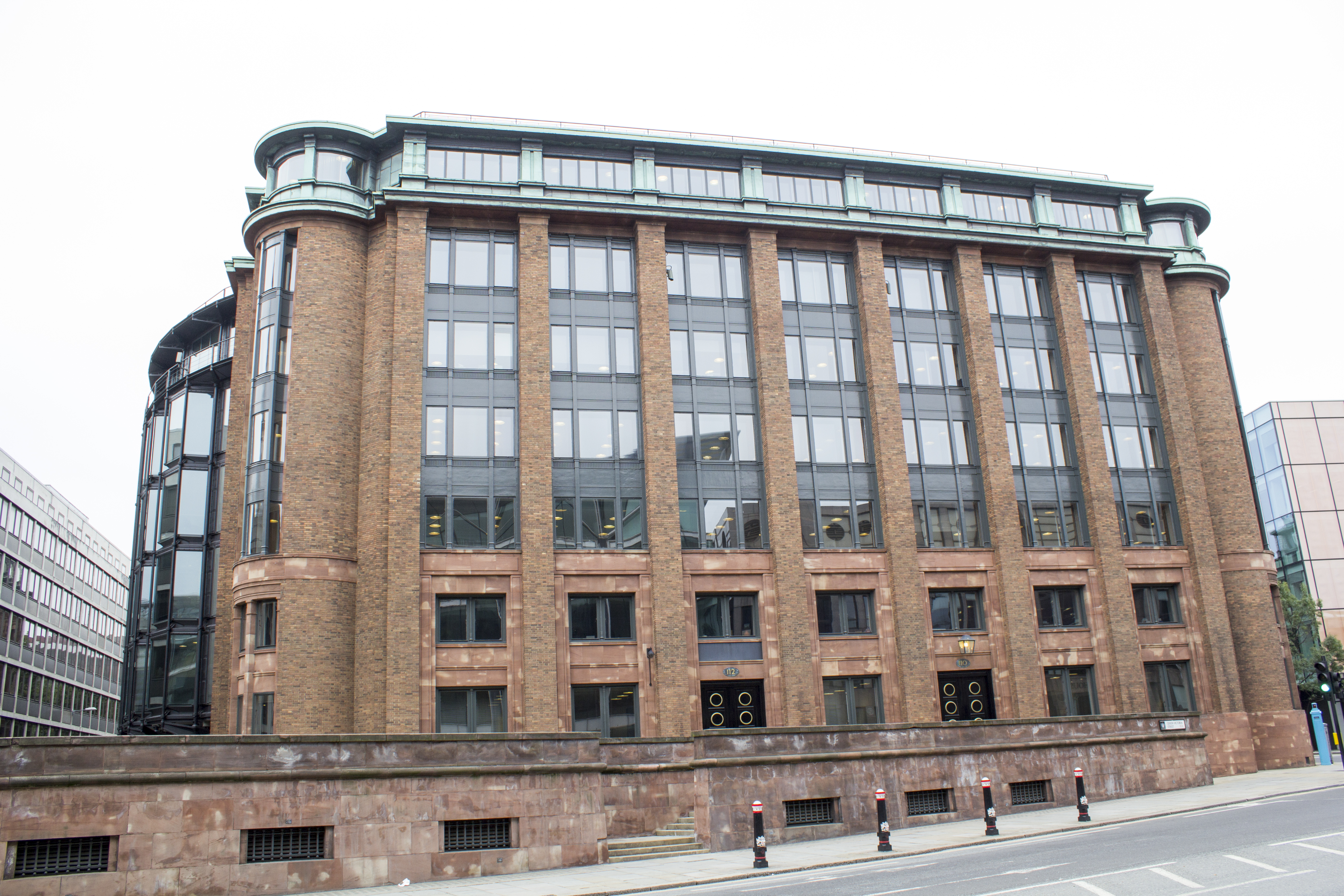
The south façade from Queen Victoria Street

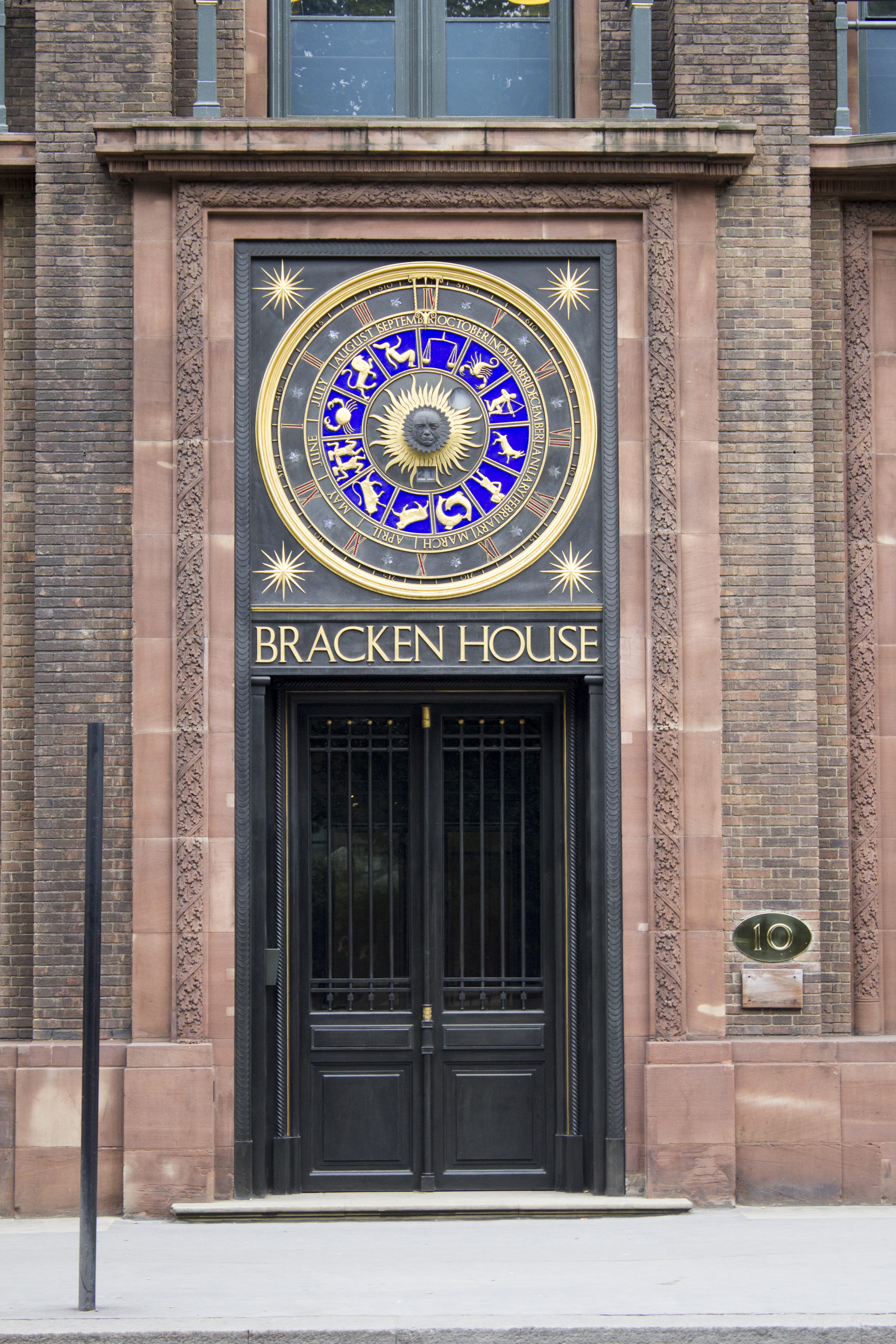
The astrological clock above the entrance, showing the Signs of the Zodiac

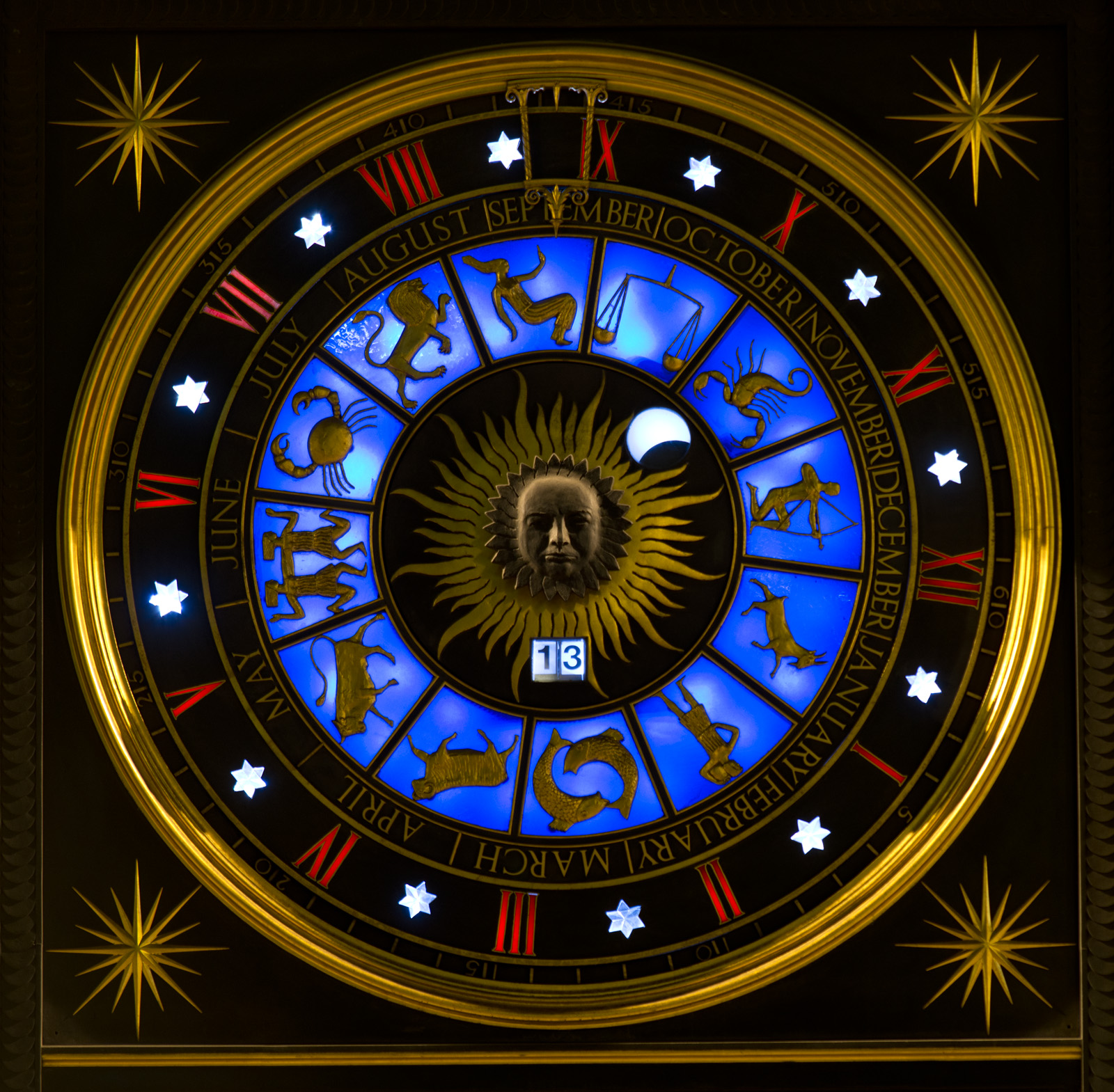
Detail of astrological clock, with the face of Winston Churchill
