= Patricia Brackin =

American mechanical engineer

Margueritte Patricia Dodd (Patsy) Brackin is an American mechanical engineer and engineering educator. She is a professor of mechanical engineering at the Rose–Hulman Institute of Technology, where she directs the engineering design program.

== Education and career ==
Despite intending to become a mathematics teacher, Brackin studied nuclear engineering as an undergraduate at the University of Tennessee, at the time her least favorite of the schools she applied to and was accepted to, but the one that offered the best financial support for her schooling. She received a bachelor's degree in 1974 and continued for a master's degree in 1975. Next, she became an engineer for the Chicago Bridge & Iron Company, in Memphis, Tennessee, where she earned the nickname "hot pants" by setting her trousers on fire with a welder on her second day at work. She earned a master's degree in mathematical sciences from the University of Memphis in 1988, and became a night school engineering design teacher at Christian Brothers University in Memphis.

In the 1990s, with three children, she went through what she describes as a "mid-life crisis". She divorced her husband, moved from Memphis, and began graduate study in mechanical engineering at Georgia Tech, completing her Ph.D. there in 1997. Her doctoral dissertation, Translating the voice of the customer into preliminary design specifications, concerned the engineering design process, and was supervised by Jonathan S. Colton. Aiming to focus more on teaching and less on research, She took her present position at the Rose–Hulman Institute of Technology in 1995.

She began working with ABET on engineering accreditation in 2003. At Rose-Hulman, she directed the Operation Catapult summer program for high school students for 11 years, and became founding director of its engineering design program. Although she was already described as heading the new program in 2016, the program officially began in 2018, and was accredited by ABET in 2023.

== Recognition ==
Brackin is a 2016 ASME Fellow, and a 2020 Fellow of ABET. She was the 2024 recipient of the Kate Gleason award of ASME, given "for outstanding contributions to undergraduate engineering education, development of design program curricula, and leadership in engineering accreditation".

The engineering design program at the Rose-Hulman Institute, founded and directed by Brackin, received the ABET Innovation Award in 2024.
