= Roger Brackins =

American visual artist

- Born: Roger Gene Brackins; Cleveland, Ohio, United States
- Occupation: Painter

"Blackened Blue" by Roger Brackins

Roger Brackins, also known as Gene St. Clair, is an American visual artist and painter from Cleveland, Ohio. Based in Columbus, Ohio, he is known for his colorful portraits and paintings exploring African American identity. Brackins has been involved with a number of public art and mural projects and has exhibited work across the United States, including at the Cincinnati Art Museum.

Brackins is a self-taught artist who began painting in 2018. His influences include Jean-Michel Basquiat, Kerry James Marshall, and Jordan Casteel.
