= Marian Spore Bush =

American painter

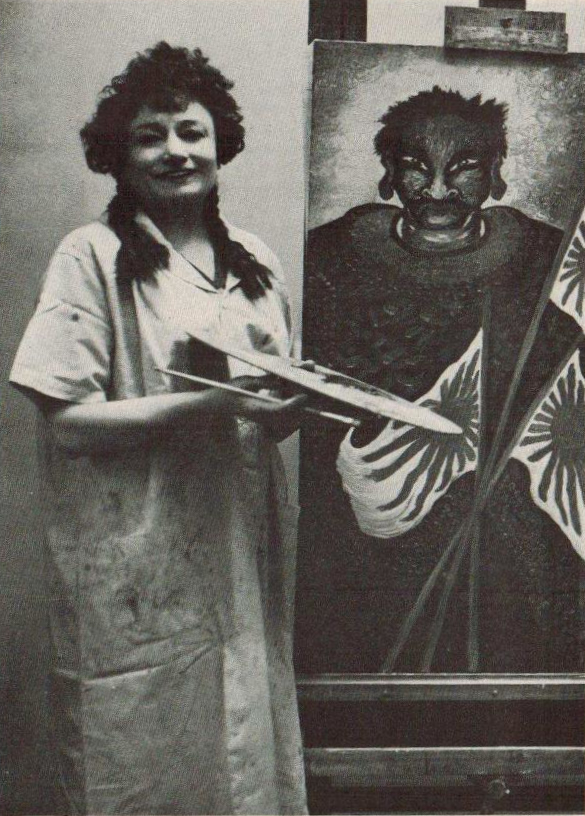
- Marian Spore Bush at the easel
- Born: Flora May Spore; October 22, 1878; Bay City, Michigan, U.S.
- Died: February 24, 1946 (aged 67)
- Other names: Flora Marian Spore; Mrs. Irving T. Bush
- Education: University of Michigan
- Occupations: dentist painter philanthropist writer
- Spouse: Irving T. Bush
- Parent(s): Melvin and Helen Miller Spore
- Relatives: James Sutherland Spore (brother)

Marian Spore Bush (born Flora May Spore, October 22, 1878 – February 24, 1946) was an American dentist, painter, and wife of industrial tycoon Irving T. Bush. She left her successful Michigan dental practice for a painting studio in Greenwich Village, New York City, and became a self-taught painter in the 1920s. She claimed her large surrealistic paintings were inspired by long-dead artists who were communicating with her from "beyond the veil." Her predictions of the future, her unusual artwork, her work with the poor in New York City's Bowery, and her late life marriage to Bush incited much interest in the national press.

== Early life and career ==
Marian Spore Bush was born Flora May Spore in Bay City, Michigan, on October 22, 1878, to Melvin and Helen Miller Spore. She attended Western High School in Bay City graduating in 1895 and went on to Ann Arbor to graduate from the University of Michigan College of Dentistry in 1899. She opened a dental office in Bay City in 1901 and became the first female dentist in Bay County. She was widely appreciated "for her progressive and excellent work in the day when she fabricated inlays, crowns, bridgework, and dental plates in her own laboratory. She was also a pioneer in the field of periodontal dentistry."

According to her sister Belle Spore Tunison, "although a woman of varied interests, Mrs. Bush never had the slightest inclination towards art—either theoretically or in practice—until after the death of her mother, Mrs. M. L. Spore, in 1919. She gave up her dental practice then and went to Guam to spend six months with her brother, Lieut. Comm. James Sutherland Spore, who was governor general at that time, and there she began her first painting." After some further travels abroad, she settled in New York City and rented a studio in Greenwich Village.

== Spiritualism and painting ==
As Flora Marian Spore, "she became well-known for a new and unusual technique, sometimes using paint so thick it seemed as much sculpture as painting. Brilliant color, power, and an unquestioned sense of design of a new and mystic school brought her work to the attention of art critics who reviewed her paintings with interest and favor."

Spore was "an early participant in an exploration of the field of extrasensory perception in collaboration with Dr. Walter Franklin Prince of the Boston Society for Psychical Research. She believed firmly in life after life and the ability of the dead to communicate with the living through mental means. She felt that her paintings were inspired and guided by artists long dead," perhaps originally introduced to her through the spirit of her deceased mother. Yet she insisted that she was not a spiritualist nor did she believe in physical mediumship.

Harry Houdini, an arch-enemy of spiritualists, was fascinated by her symbolist art. In 1924, Houdini's remarks about her paintings were printed in the New York Sun: "It is a great exhibition. I am certain of Miss Spore's honesty. I have never excluded the possibility of supernatural intervention from my belief. I have been engaged in the exposure of criminal fakers… there is no question of that here. Miss Spore has something beautiful and is conveying it to her fellow men.".

Spore's paintings were exhibited in the most prestigious art galleries of New York City: Knoedler's, Wildenstein's, Grand Central Art Galleries and also the Fine Arts Gallery of London, "where art critics, society reporters, and psychiatrists, as well as crowds of the general public, flocked to see them." She received much publicity from both the mainstream press and sensationalist tabloids, which printed such articles as "Mystic voices led her to romance, fame and wealth" and "Pictures my mother sends me from beyond the grave."

== Later life and work ==
In the late 1920s, having dropped the name Flora, Marian "started a breadline in the Bowery. First with her own money and then with the financial assistance of other benefactors, she personally dispensed such things as meal tickets, clothing, spectacles, false teeth, and wheelchairs." She became known to the press as Lady Bountiful of the Bowery. While engaged in this work she met Irving T. Bush, founder and president of Bush Terminal Company in New York City, and Bush House in London. They were married in Reno on June 9, 1930, an hour after Bush's divorce from his second wife became final. Shortly afterwards, Marian closed her soup kitchen, feeling that other relief agencies could handle the work more efficiently.

Henceforth, Marian Bush split her life between acting the society hostess and being a practicing artist. In "symbolism and mood her paintings seemed to forecast world events and conditions. Early in the 1930s, her art took an entirely new trend. Up to this time her palette had been extraordinarily vivid. Now she seemed impelled to paint huge stark canvases in black and white, all of war or presaging war." One example, entitled "New York City: When?" shows two airplanes and burning buildings amidst the skyscrapers of New York.

Edward Alden Jewell, art critic for the New York Times, said of her 1943 New York exhibition, "I should be inclined to refer to her work in this field as that of a primitive mystic. The large black and white canvases seem at once crude and powerful….All the war paintings are symbolic in nature. Their impact is sharp and disturbing. If accepted as manifestations of psychic phenomena, they are mysterious."

There was one exception to the trend of her later work. In 1942, Marian produced a series of small paintings of scenes from the island of Guam, where she stayed in the early 1920s while visiting her brother. The New York Times' art critic described these canvases as "high in key" and observed they "involve extensive use of impasto." According to an art gallery newsletter, "these Guam paintings are delightful primitives, very colorful and full of the movement of the sea and palm trees."

== Philanthropist ==
As a wealthy Park Avenue resident, she operated a soup kitchen for the poor and needy in New York City's Bowery section, beginning in 1927. By February 1930 she worked four months annually, from January until April, relieving a populace of unskilled labor. During the Great Depression a growing breadline formed a street-wide T from Second Avenue (Manhattan) to the Bowery. It extended for a city block and a half.

She distributed more than $1,300 weekly in meal tickets purchased from the Y.M.C.A. at 22 East Third Street. She provided alms for the feeble, the crippled, and the starving. Four tickets purchased for a nickel each made up the smallest semi-weekly ration. Spore added a small colored ticket which was paired with meal tickets. The colored ticket gave one admittance to a small headquarters composed of two rooms, located at 24 East Third Street. On the next day of distribution the ticket holder could enter the building where Spore spent two hours every Monday and Thursday. Inside the headquarters, converted from a squalid tenement, she carried out the distribution of pants, overcoats, shoes, and other clothing, which Spore bought from stores which sold to her.

In February 1930 Spore left her Park Avenue apartment for several weeks. However, her chauffeur, a Y.M.C.A employee, continued to give out meal tickets and clothing to the disadvantaged.

== Writings and legacy ==
Spore wrote a semi-autobiographical book about her spirit paintings, entitled They, which was published posthumously in 1947 by the Beechhurst Press of New York. She also wrote numerous children's stories which have never been published.

After her death in New York on February 24, 1946, a large retrospective exhibition of her work was organized in New York City. Most of her early paintings were sold to patrons, and many of her important works are still owned by her descendants.

In her obituary, the New York Times reprinted the statement of Dr. Walter Franklin Prince, "for many years research and executive officer of the Society for Psychical Research, [who] has said of Mrs. Bush, 'She represents a very unusual and remarkable phenomena, at least part of which is quite beyond explanation by our present science. Her honesty and general character are beyond doubt...that she is able to state facts probably unknown to her to a degree beyond the limits of chance has been absolutely proved by me. Here is a remarkable and perplexing case.'"

Bush was included in the 2021-22 exhibition "Supernatural America: The Paranormal in American Art," and its accompanying catalogue (University of Chicago Press), curated by Robert Cozzolino. The exhibition was on view at the Toledo Museum of Art in Ohio, the Speed Art Museum in Louisville, Kentucky, and the Minneapolis Institute of Art, the organizing institution. Bush is substantially discussed in an essay on Spirit artists, written by Cozzolino, in the multi-author catalogue. In 2025, art curator Bob Nickas organized an exhibition of her paintings called Life Afterlife, Works c. 1919–1945 for the Karma Gallery in New York City.
