= Coronet (yacht) =

- CORONET (Wooden Hull Schooner Yacht)
- U.S. National Register of Historic Places
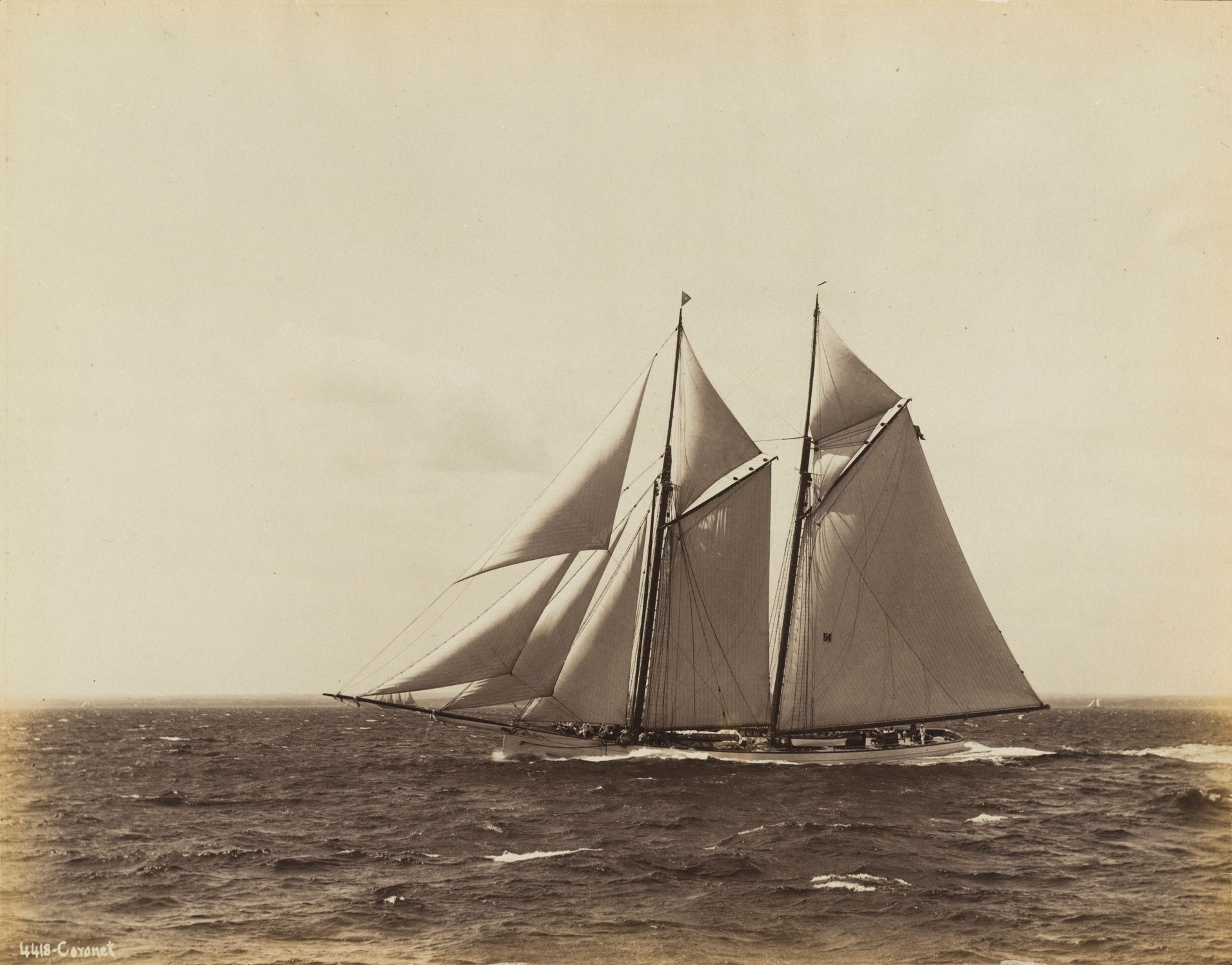
- Coronet in race, 1893

- Location within Connecticut Location within the United States
- Location: Mystic, Connecticut
- Coordinates: 41°21′41″N 71°57′52″W
- Built: 1885
- Built by: C. & R. Poillon
- Architect: William Townsend
- NRHP reference No.: 04000571
- Added to NRHP: June 3, 2004

Coronet is a 131' wooden-hull schooner yacht built for oil tycoon Rufus T. Bush in 1885. It is one of the oldest and largest vessels of its type in the world, and one of the last grand sailing yachts of the 19th century extant. After numerous owners and decades of neglect, it underwent an extensive restoration at Newport, Rhode Island's, The International Yacht Restoration School from 2010 to 2022. She was transferred to Mystic Seaport for the final leg of her restoration

== History ==
The 131-foot (40 m) schooner Coronet was designed by William Townsend and built for Rufus T. Bush by the C. & R. Poillon shipyard in Brooklyn. Bush then put forth a $10,000 challenge against any other yacht for a transatlantic race. The ocean race between Coronet and the Caldwell Hart Colt's yacht Dauntless in March 1887 made Bush and the victorious Coronet famous— The New York Times devoted its entire first page for March 28, 1887 to the story.

After winning the 3,000-mile race and the $10,000 purse, Bush decided to sell Coronet and listed the vessel in England for $30,000. Rufus and his son Irving T. Bush then circumnavigated the globe on Coronet in 1888. Coronet was the first registered yacht to cross Cape Horn from East to West. After crossing the Pacific Ocean and stopping in Hawaii, Coronet made port in China, Calcutta, Malta and elsewhere.

Coronet was sold before Rufus's death in 1890 The vessel then passed through six different owners (Arthur E. Bateman, John D. Wing, Arthur Curtiss James, Fred S. Pearson, John I. Waterbury, and Louis Bossert) by 1905. The Coronet circumnavigated the globe several times and was used for a Japanese-American scientific excursion during an eclipse.

The Kingdom, a religious organization founded by Frank Sandford, purchased the ship in 1905 for $10,000 and took it around the world on prayer missions, including to Palestine. Coronet took a poorly planned missionary voyage to Africa in 1911 which resulted in six persons on board dying of scurvy. After the voyage, The Kingdom kept the yacht moored at Portland, Maine as well as Gloucester, Massachusetts and owned her until 1995.

== Restoration ==
The International Yacht Restoration School, in Newport, Rhode Island acquired the vessel in 1995 and began its restoration. IYRS added Coronet to the National Register of Historic Places in 2004. In December 2006, IYRS conveyed title of the boat to the Coronet Restoration Partners in San Francisco to complete the restoration on IYRS's campus in Rhode Island, where restoration works started in 2010. She was transferred to Mystic Seaport's restoration facility in December 2022 for the final leg of restoration.

== Coronet Gallery ==
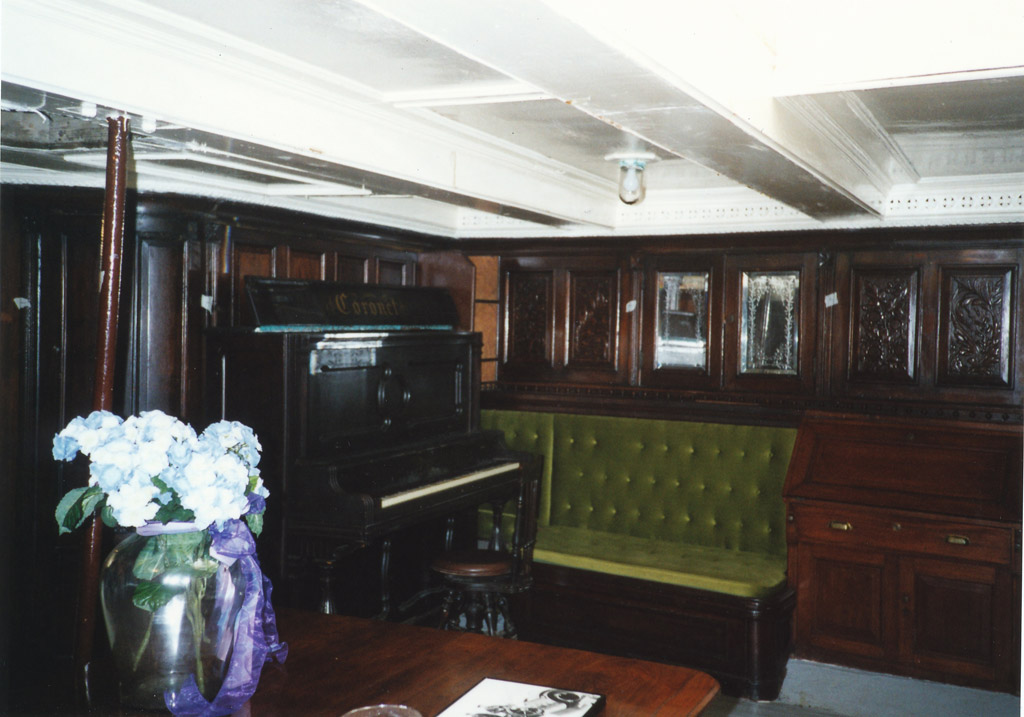
Coronet interior, showing original woodwork

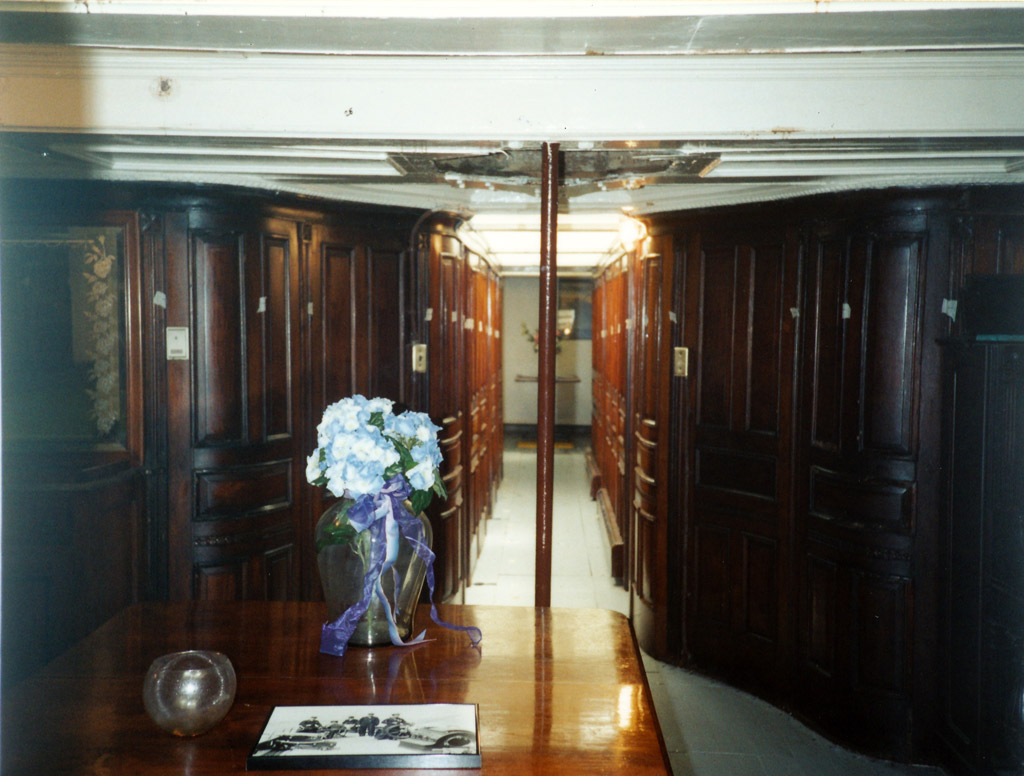
Coronet interior, hallway. Note curvilinear woodwork and etched mirror to left.

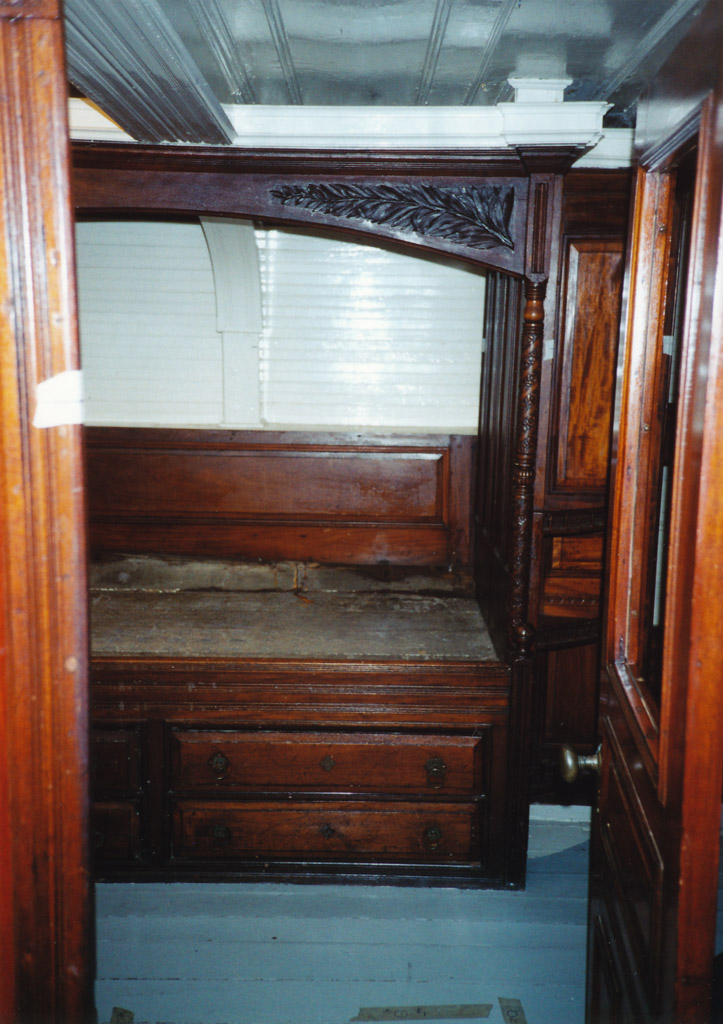
Coronet interior, berth

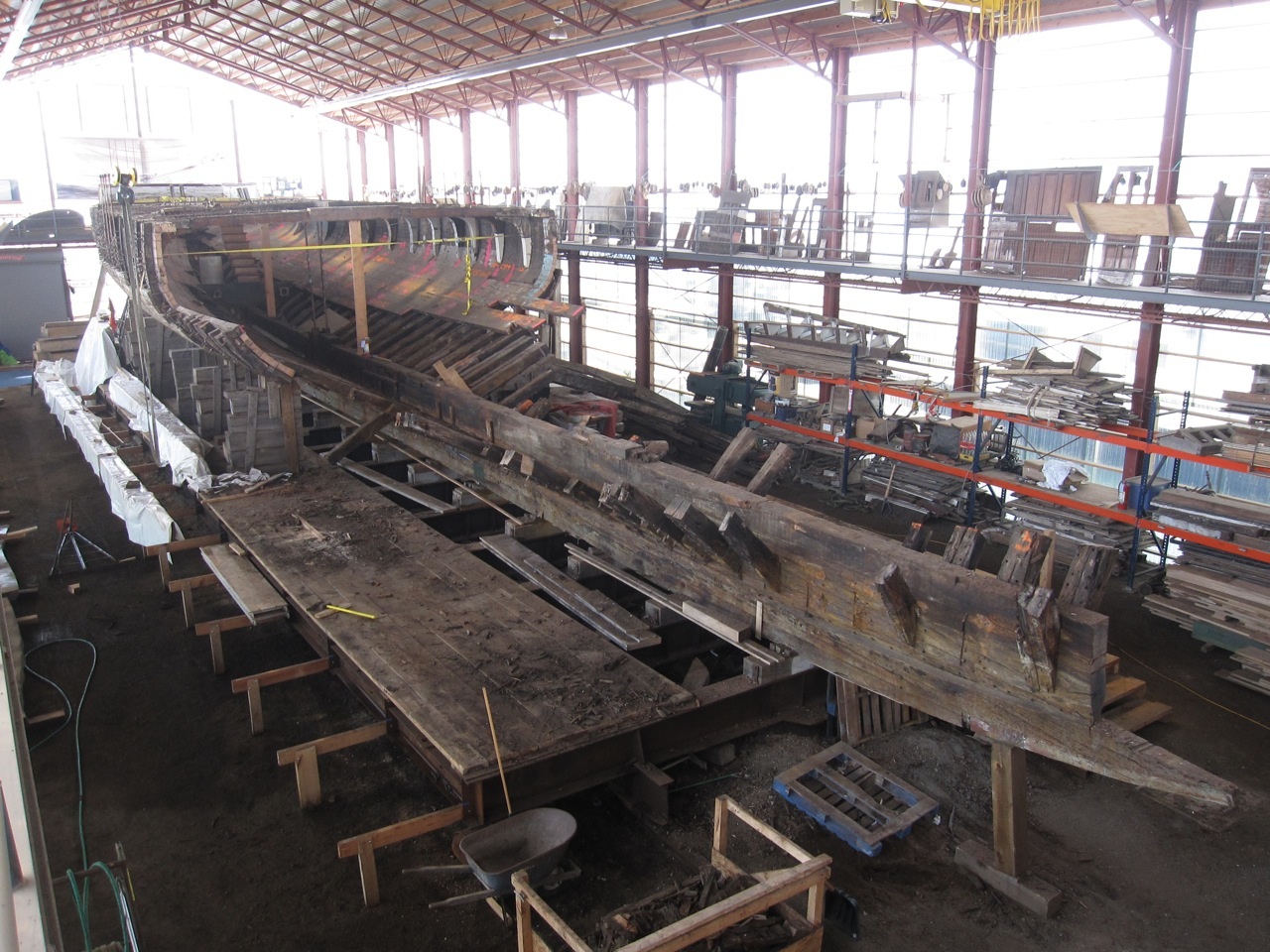
Coronet under restoration.

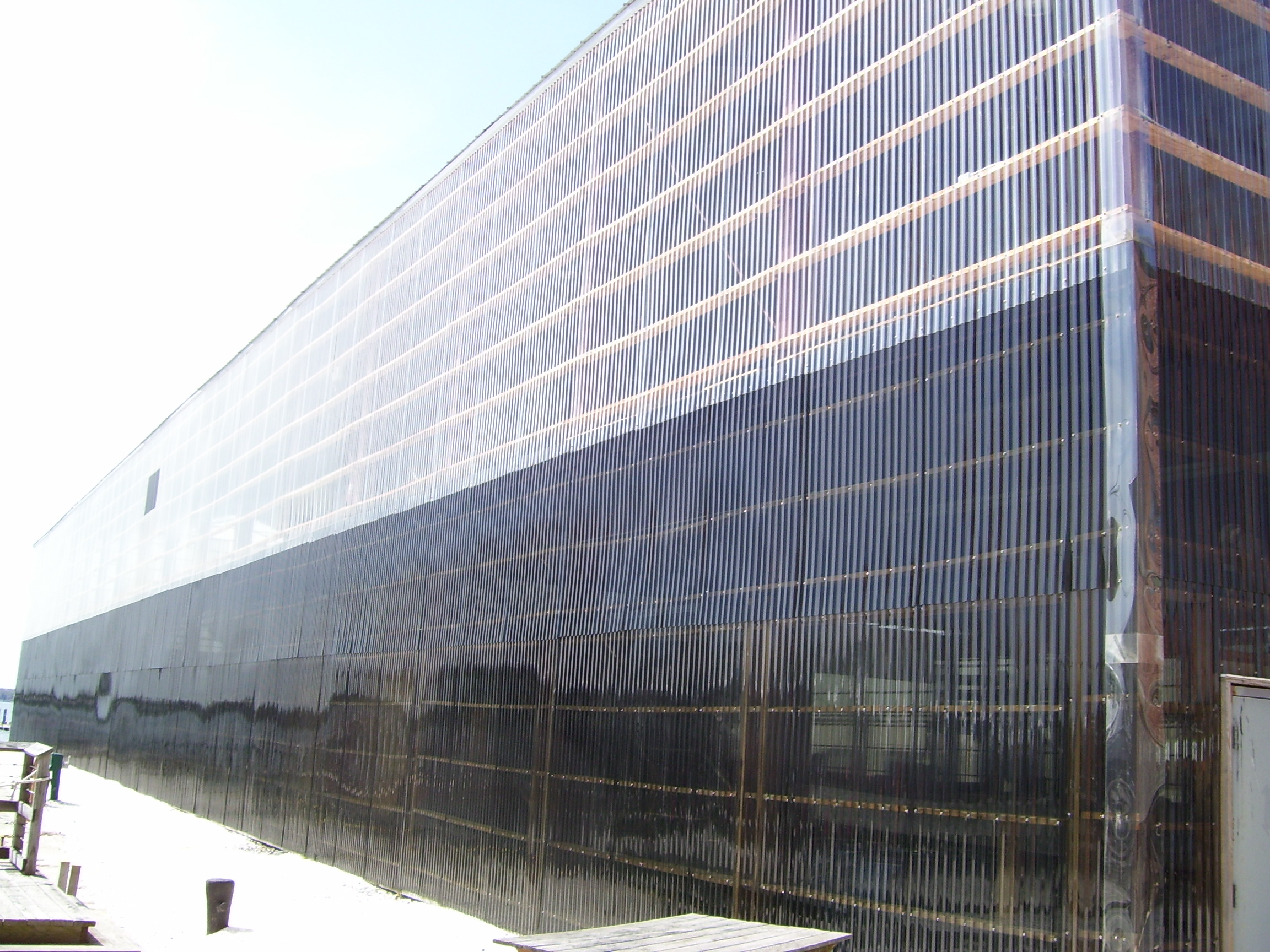
building at IYRS housing the Coronet during 2008 restoration

== See also ==
- List of oldest surviving ships
- List of schooners
- National Register of Historic Places listings in New London County, Connecticut
