= Hattie Elizabeth Burdette =

American painter (1872–1955)

- Born: 1872; Washington, D.C., US
- Died: 1955 (aged 82–83); Washington, D.C., US
- Occupation: Artist
- Known for: Portrait and miniature painting
- Notable work: George Washington as Master of His Lodge, 1932

Hattie Elizabeth Burdette (1872–1955) was an American painter. She painted portraits, miniatures, and still lifes in oil, watercolor and pastels. Burdette's best-known work was a portrait of George Washington as a Mason, painted for the George Washington Bicentennial Commission using items that Washington himself had used during his life.

== Early life ==
Burdette was born and raised in Washington, D.C., and educated in the local schools before studying art with Harold MacDonald at the Norwood Institute.

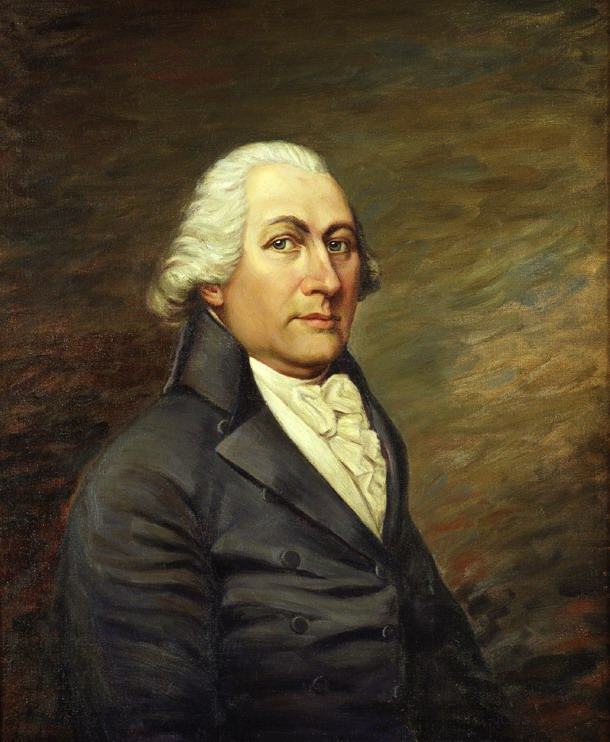
Burdette's portrait of John Langdon, currently in the collection of the United States Capitol

== Artistic career ==
Burdette was very active in the Washington D.C. arts community.

She was one of the charter members of the Washington Water Color Club at its founding in 1896, and remained a member, exhibiting with them nearly every year until 1926. Burdette was also one the founders of the Society of Washington Artists. She served as vice-president from 1926 to 1929 and exhibited with the society for nearly every year between 1892 and 1932, and received honorable mention in 1922. Burdette was a founding member of the Miniature Painters, Sculptors and Gravers Society of Washington, of which organization she served as president in 1933 and 1934.

Her work appeared in the Greater Washington Independent Exhibition of 1935. A portrait of Mabel Boardman, owned by the American Red Cross, appeared in an exhibit at the National Gallery of Art in 1950. Her miniatures won several awards at the Royal Society of Miniature Painters in London.

Burdette's most famous painting, a portrait of George Washington as a Freemason, was commissioned in 1931 by Freemason and U.S. Congressman Sol Bloom for the George Washington Bicentennial Commission. Actor Tefft Johnson served as a model for Washington. The painting was donated to the George Washington Masonic National Memorial by Sol Bloom as a memorial to his wife. Prints of the portrait were sold as souvenirs for the Washington bicentennial.

== Death and legacy ==
Burdette lived her whole life in Washington, D.C. and continued painting until about three years before her death in 1955. She is buried at Congressional Cemetery along with other Burdette family members.

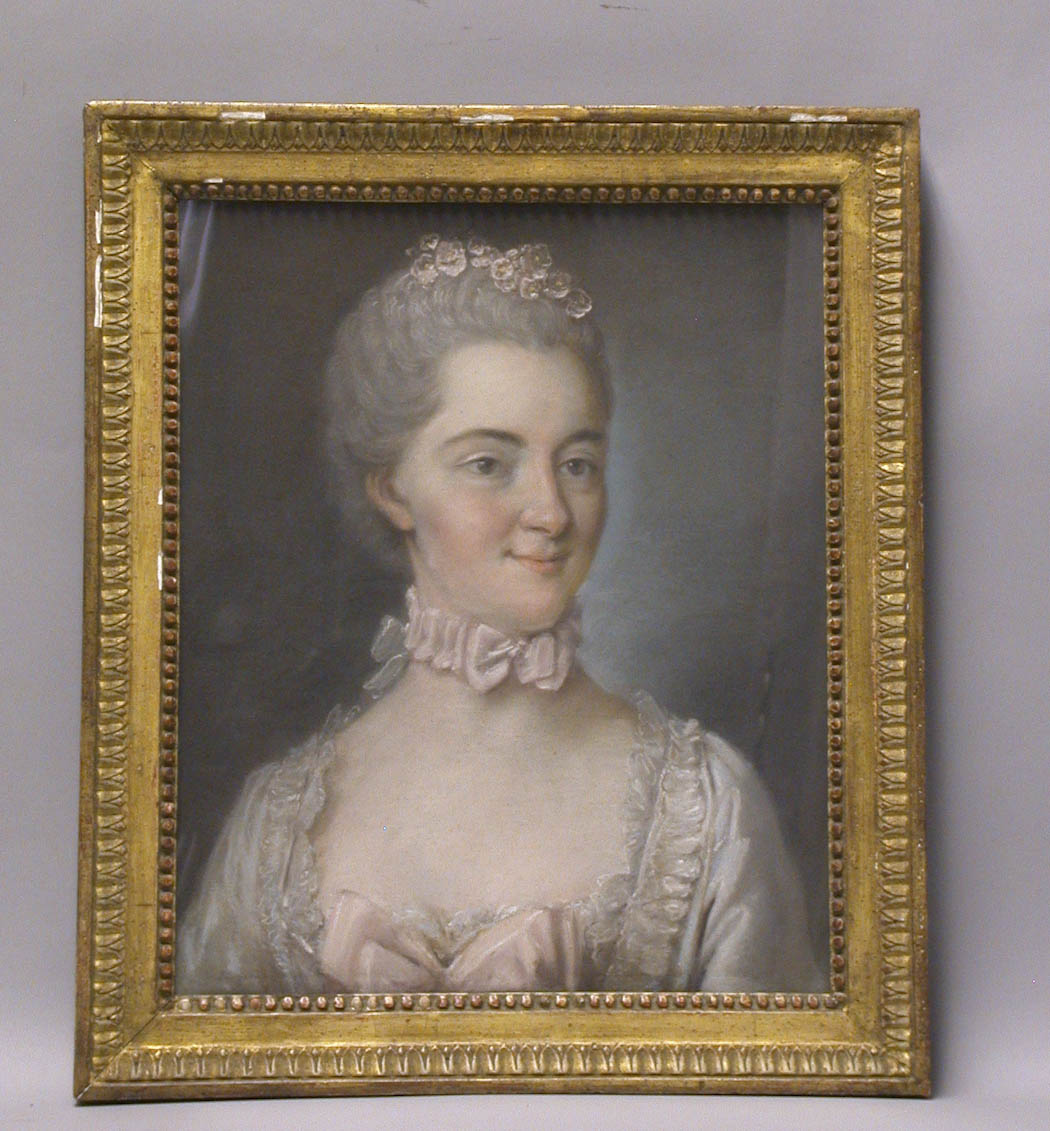
Marquise de Pelleport, watercolor on ivory, Hagley Museum and Library, Wilmington, DE

== Collections ==
- Architect of the Capital, Washington, D.C.
- Smithsonian American Art Museum, Washington, D.C.
- National Portrait Gallery, Washington, D.C.
- Naval Historical Foundation, Washington, D.C.
- George Washington Masonic National Memorial, Alexandria, VA
- Washington and Lee University, Lexington, VA
- Hagley Museum and Library, Wilmington, DE
- Western Reserve Historical Society, Cleveland, OH
- Telfair Museums, Savannah, GA
