= Frank Costantino =

American architectural illustrator

Frank Costantino is an American artist and architectural illustrator. He is a recipient of the Hugh Ferriss Memorial Prize, the highest award of the American Society of Architectural Illustrators in recognition of excellence in the graphic representation of architecture.
