= Society of Architectural Illustrators =

- Abbreviation: SAI
- Formation: 1975
- Type: Professional organisation
- Purpose: To promote the knowledge and appreciation of architectural illustration, which includes model making and photography, in the professional and public domain, and to encourage, and support practitioners in this craft. To give formal recognition to practitioners, maintain and enhance our country’s fine tradition in this specialised field of visual communication for the benefit of its members and the community at large
- Headquarters: Rotherfield, East Sussex, England, UK
- President: Don Coe FSAI
- Chairman: Tim Richardson FSAI
- Website: www.sai.org.uk

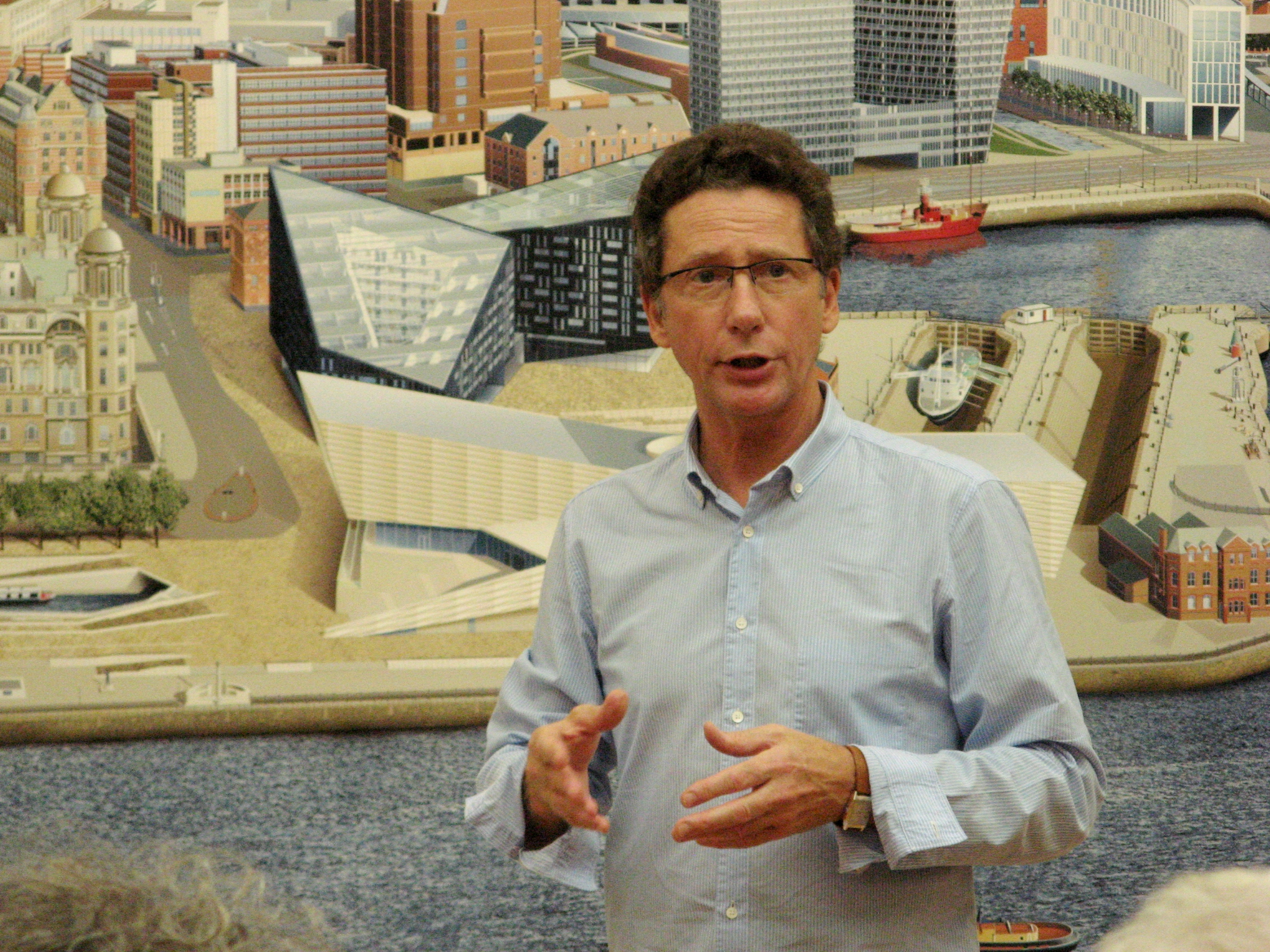
The Society's patron, Ben Johnson, in front of his Liverpool Cityscape, at the Walker Art Gallery, Liverpool in 2008

The Society of Architectural Illustrators (SAI) was founded in the United Kingdom by Eric Monk in 1975 to encourage the use of the architectural perspective or model as a valuable part of the communication process between architect and the general public. It changed its name to the Society of Architectural and Industrial Illustrators in the 1980s in a bid to increase membership. This did not work and the name was finally changed, after a protracted debate, to the Society of Architectural Illustration in the 1990s. This last name change was at the behest of the Charity Commission which insisted that the Society exists for the benefit of the art and not the artist. In 2019 the Society relinquished its charity status and reverted to its original name.

The SAI was the first organisation worldwide to provide the services of a professional body to the public and practitioners in architectural illustration and this lead has been followed in other major countries, most notably by the American Society of Architectural illustrators. SAI members work in several disciplines including illustration, animation, model making and photography.

The objectives of the SAI are to:

- foster the use of the Architectural Perspective as a necessary communication medium between Designer and Layman.
- acknowledge the time-honoured status of Architectural Illustration and formalise its position as that of a separate discipline.
- establish high standards and the conferring of a professional qualification to those meeting such requirements.
- make regular distribution of details of members to potential clients and provide a clients' advisory service.
- hold exhibitions and meetings as required by the membership. Issue journals and newsletters for the exchange of ideas between members.
- provide guidance and help in matters of contracts, copyright and other legal and business affairs.
- provide an effective human instrument of friendship and co-operation between members.

The present patrons of the Society are British painter Ben Johnson and English Architect Norman Foster, Baron Foster of Thames Bank. Previous patrons include Sir John Betjeman, Sir Hugh Casson and Gordon Cullen.

The president of the Society is Don Coe FSAI, previously chairman of the Society for 25 years. Tim Richardson took office as chairman at the 2024 AGM.

== See also ==
- Architectural illustrator
- American Society of Architectural Illustrators
