= Fortes.Vision =

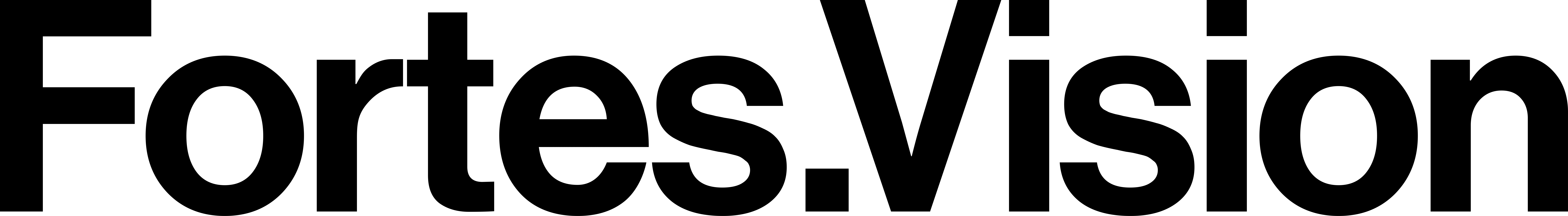
- Trade name: FORTES.VISION
- Company type: Private
- Industry: Architectural visualisation; 3D rendering; architectural animation; multimedia for the built environment
- Founded: 2017
- Founders: Oleh Bushanskyi, Daniel Nagaets, Oleksandr Babaian
- Headquarters: New York, the US
- Area served: International
- Services: Photorealistic exterior and interior renderings; architectural animation; 360° panoramas; virtual tours; urban-planning visualisations
- Website: fortes.vision

Fortes.Vision is an international architectural visualisation studio that produces photorealistic 3D renderings, architectural animations, virtual tours, and related multimedia for architects, real-estate developers, and design agencies.

== History ==
Fortes.Vision was founded in 2017 in New York.

In August 2024, Fortes.Vision used AI together with Google Earth imagery to extract city geometry and produce high-resolution urban-planning visualizations for a Barcelona project.

In 2025, the company was recognized as one of the top 5 leading architectural 3D rendering studios in the US, and was included in Architizer A+Awards lists. At the same year, Fortes.Vision was named Interior CGI Company USA and Architectural CGI Company USA in the International Property Awards.

== Services ==
The studio offers a range of services commonly used in the architecture and real-estate sectors, including photorealistic exterior and interior 3D renderings, architectural animation, 360° panoramas and virtual tours, marketing visuals, and project branding. Fortes.Vision also publishes guides and blog posts on topics such as choosing a rendering vendor and software used in visualization workflows.

Fortes.Vision's portfolio spans high-end residential, commercial, and cultural projects worldwide, including real-estate marketing imagery, private villas, conceptual competition entries, and short animated films; featured work includes DIAMANTI, Sant Feliu, Glass Bridge.

The studio's clients have included academic institutions and large developers—such as Harvard University, the University of Pennsylvania, OBMI, and —and it has worked on a digital twin project representing a city of approximately two million inhabitants.
