= Architectural drawing =

Technical drawing of a building or building project

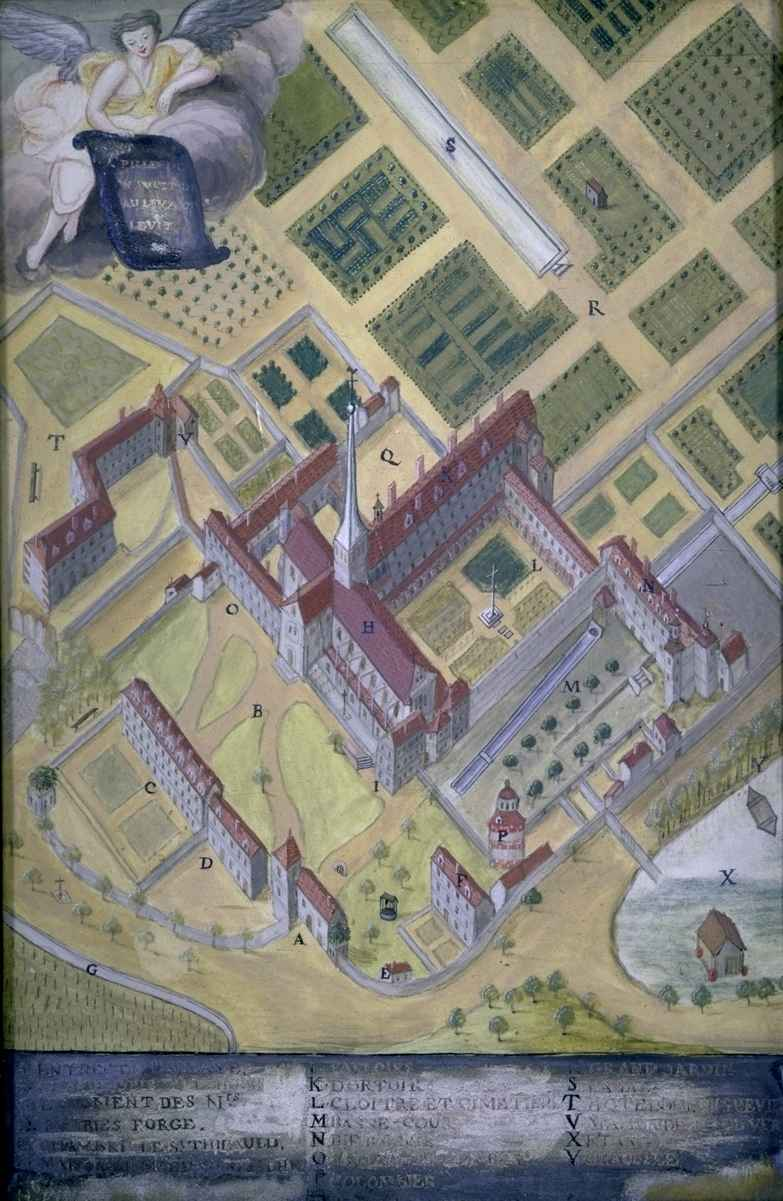
18th-century axonometric plan of Port-Royal-des-Champs

An architectural drawing or architect's drawing is a technical drawing of a building or building project that falls within the definition of architecture. Architectural drawings are used by architects and others for a number of purposes: to develop a design idea into a coherent proposal, to communicate ideas and concepts, to show clients the merits of a design, to assist a building contractor in construction based on design intent, to record the design and planned development, or to document a building that already exists.

Architectural drawings are made according to a set of conventions, including particular views such as floor plans and sections, sheet sizes, units of measurement, scales, annotation and cross-referencing.

Historically, drawings were made in ink on paper or similar materials, and copies had to be made by hand. The twentieth century saw a shift to drawing on tracing paper so that mechanical copies could be made more efficiently. The development of the computer had a major impact on the methods used to design and create technical drawings, making manual drawing less common and opening up new possibilities of form using organic shapes and complex geometry. Today, most architectural drawings are created using CAD software.

== Size and scale ==
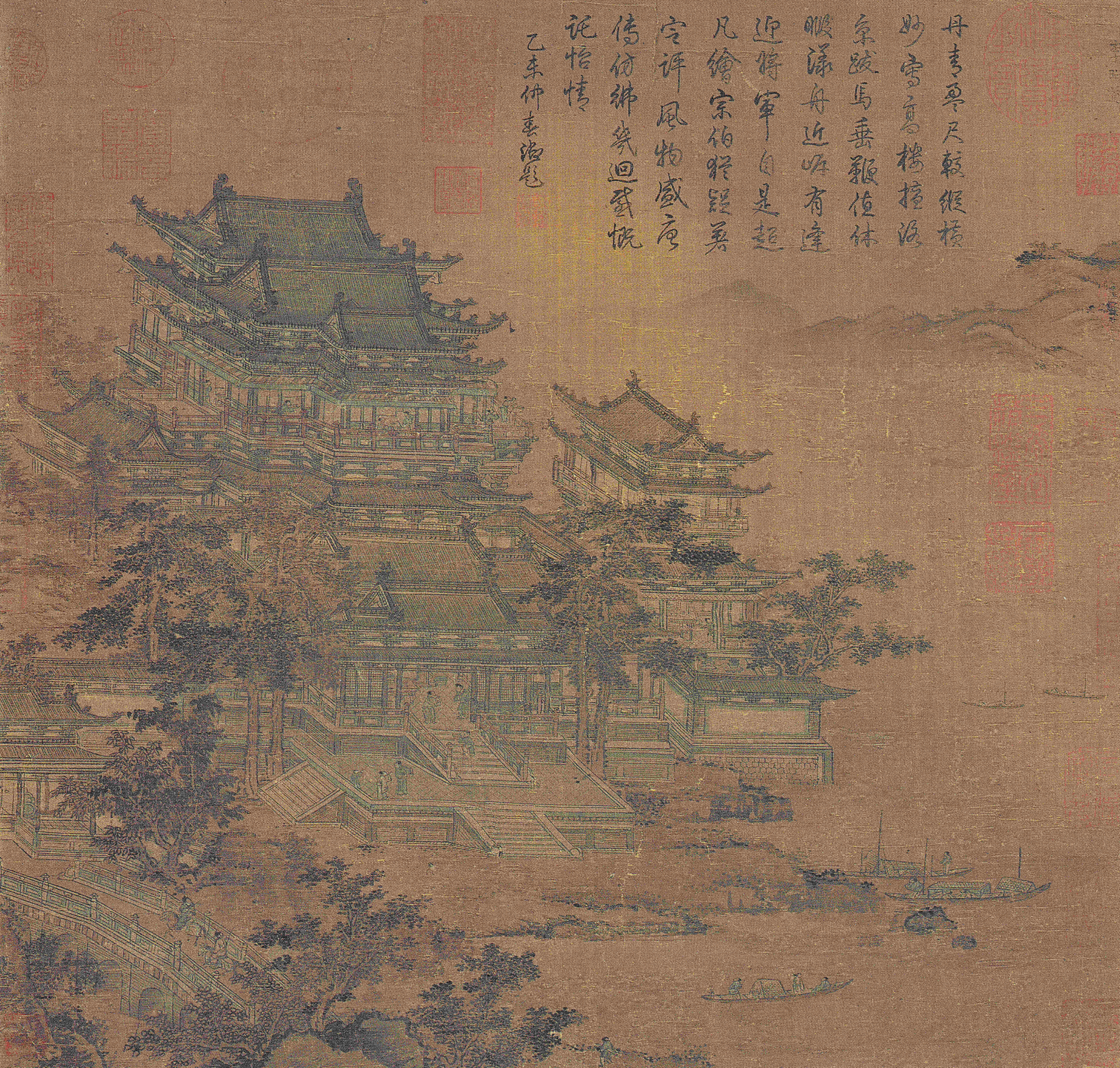
Luoyang Pavilion by Li Zhaodao (675–758)

The size of drawings reflects the materials available and the size that is convenient to transport, whether rolled, folded, laid out on a table or pinned on a wall. The drafting process may impose limitations on the size that is realistically workable. Sizes are determined by a consistent paper size system according to local usage. Normally, the largest paper size used in modern architectural practice is ISO A0 (841 mm × 1,189 mm or 33.1 in × 46.8 in), or, in the United States, Arch E (762 mm × 1,067 mm or 30 in × 42 in) or Large E size (915 mm × 1,220 mm or 36 in × 48 in).

Architectural drawings are drawn to scale so that relative sizes are correctly represented. The scale is chosen both to ensure that the whole building will fit on the chosen sheet size and to show the required amount of detail. On a scale of one-eighth of an inch to one foot (1:96), or the metric equivalent of 1:100, walls are typically shown as simple outlines corresponding to the overall thickness. At a larger scale, such as half an inch to one foot (1:24), or the nearest common metric equivalent of 1:20, the layers of different materials that make up the wall construction are shown. Construction details are drawn to a larger scale, in some cases full size.

Scale drawings enable dimensions to be read from the drawing. Imperial scales can be read using an ordinary ruler. On a one-eighth inch to one-foot scale drawing, the one-eighth divisions on the ruler can be read as feet. Architects normally use a scale ruler with different scales marked on each edge. A third method, used by builders in estimating, is to measure directly from the drawing and multiply by the scale factor.

Dimensions can be measured from drawings made on a stable medium such as vellum. All processes of reproduction introduce small errors, especially when the same drawing is copied repeatedly or copied using different methods. Consequently, dimensions need to be written, or "figured", on the drawing. The disclaimer "Do not scale off dimensions" is commonly inscribed on architects' drawings to guard against errors arising in the copying process.

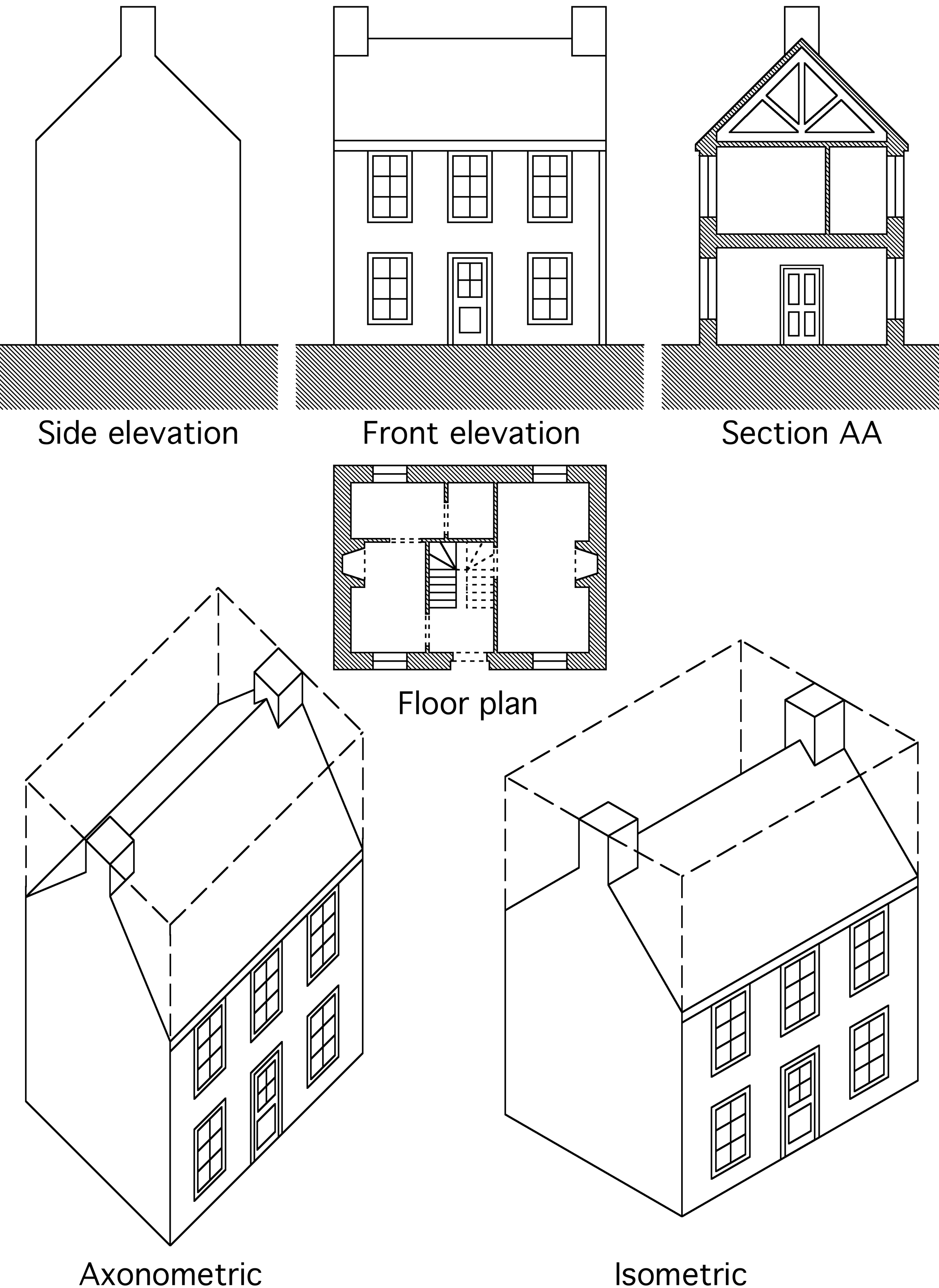
Standard views used in architects' drawings

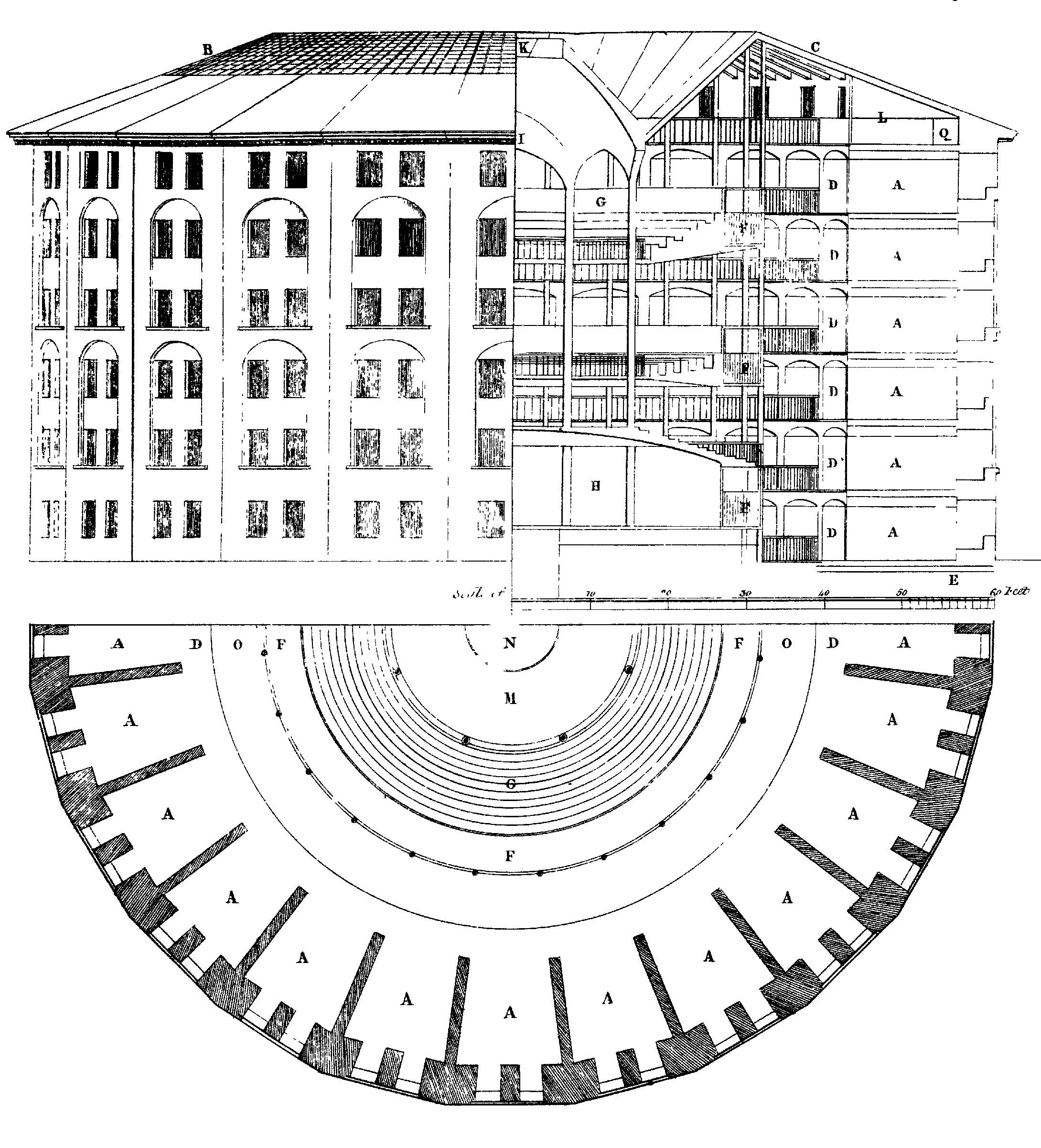
Architectural drawing combining elevation, section and plan: drawings by Willey Reveley of Jeremy Bentham's proposal for a Panopticon prison, 1791

== Standard views used in architectural drawing ==
This section deals with the conventional views used to represent a building or structure. See the types of architectural drawing section below for drawings classified according to their purpose.

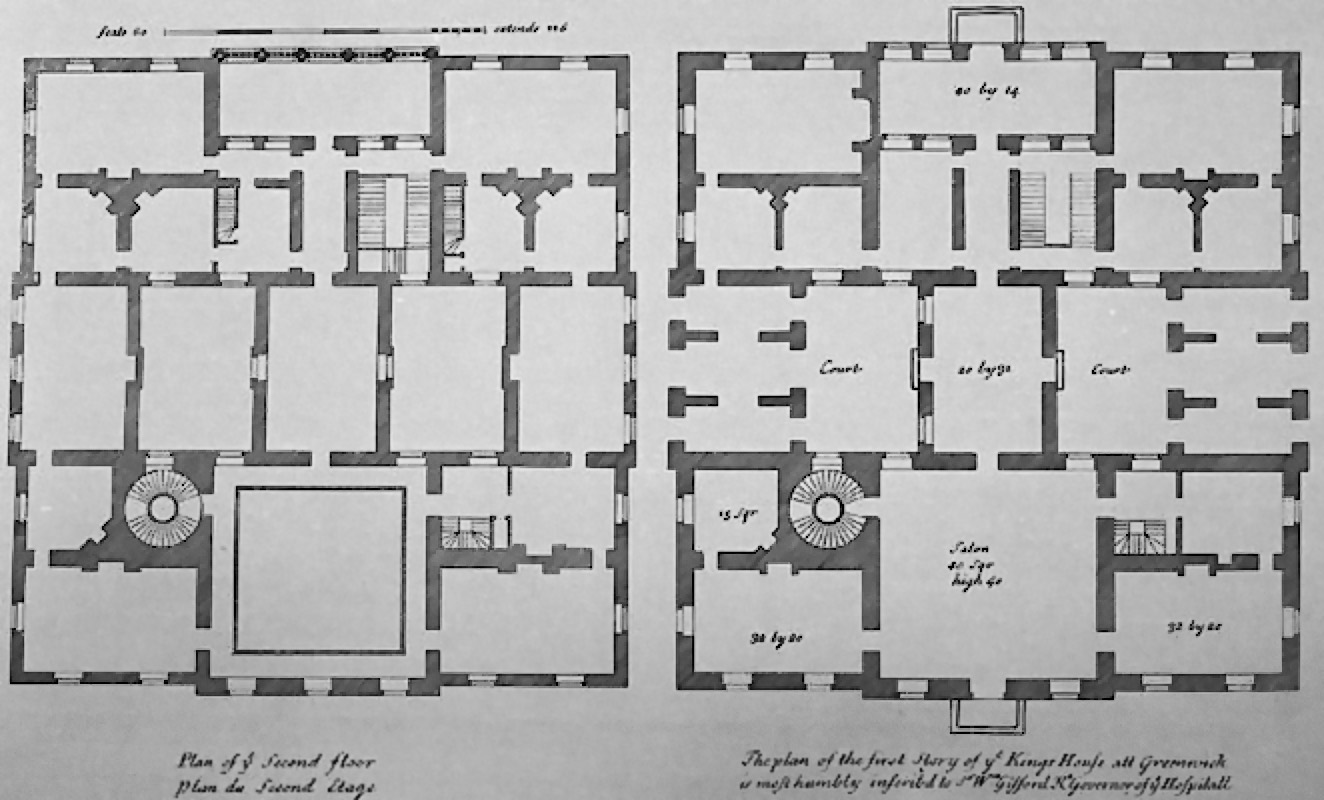
Principal floor plan of the Queen's House, Greenwich, United Kingdom

=== Floor plan ===
A floor plan is the most fundamental architectural diagram. It is a view from above showing the arrangement of spaces in a building in a similar way to a map, but at a particular level of a building. Technically, it is a horizontal section cut through a building, conventionally at about four feet, or 1.2 metres, above floor level, showing walls, windows, door openings and other features at that level. The plan view includes anything that could be seen below that level, such as the floor, stairs up to the plan level, fittings and sometimes furniture. Objects above the plan level, such as overhead beams, can be indicated with dashed lines.

Geometrically, plan view is defined as a vertical orthographic projection of an object onto a horizontal plane, with the horizontal plane cutting through the building.

=== Site plan ===
A site plan is a specific type of plan showing the whole context of a building or group of buildings. It shows property boundaries, means of access to the site and nearby structures if they are relevant to the design. For a development on an urban site, the site plan may need to show adjoining streets to demonstrate how the design fits into the urban fabric. Within the site boundary, the site plan gives an overview of the entire scope of work. It shows existing and proposed buildings, usually as building footprints, as well as roads, parking areas, footpaths, hard landscaping, trees and planting. For a construction project, the site plan also needs to show service connections such as drainage and sewer lines, water supply, electrical and communications cables, and exterior lighting.

Site plans are commonly used to represent a building proposal before detailed design. Drawing up a site plan is a tool for deciding the site layout, size and orientation of proposed new buildings. A site plan is also used to verify that a proposal complies with local development codes, including restrictions on historical sites. In this context, the site plan may form part of a legal agreement, and there may be a requirement for it to be drawn up by a licensed professional such as an architect, engineer, landscape architect or land surveyor.

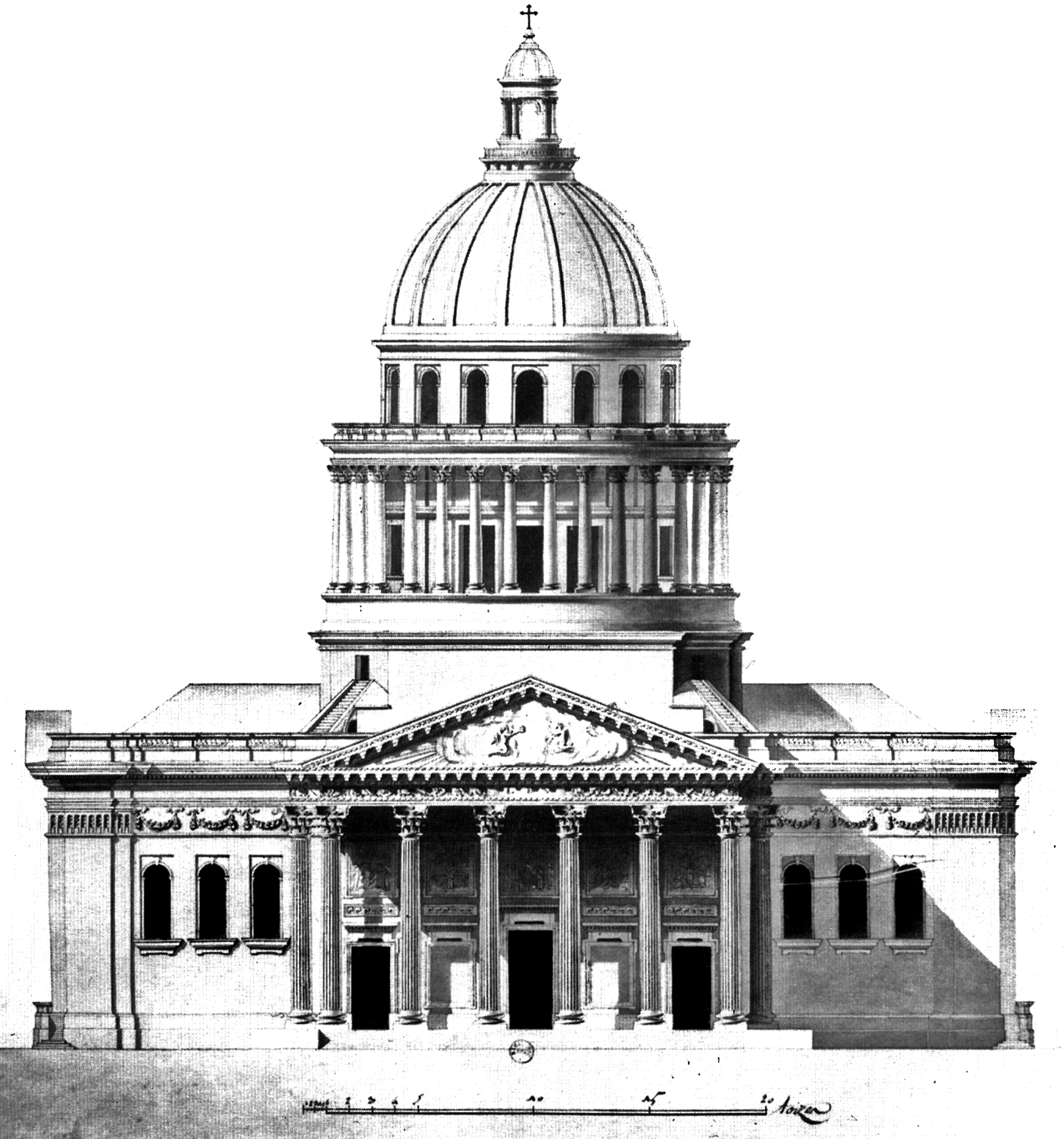
Elevation of the principal façade of the Panthéon, Paris

=== Elevation ===
An elevation is a view of a building seen from one side, as a flat representation of one façade. This is the most common view used to describe the external appearance of a building. Each elevation is labelled in relation to the compass direction it faces. For example, looking toward the north means viewing the southern elevation of the building. Buildings are rarely simple rectangular shapes in plan, so a typical elevation may show all the parts of the building seen from a particular direction.

Geometrically, an elevation is a horizontal orthographic projection of a building onto a vertical plane, with the vertical plane normally being parallel to one side of the building. Architects also use elevation as a synonym for façade, so a north elevation is the north-facing wall of a building.

=== Cross section ===
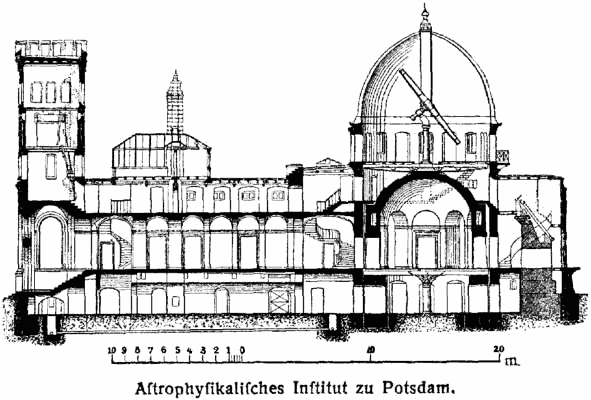
Section drawing of the Observatorium at Potsdam

A cross section, also called a section, represents a vertical plane cut through an object, in the same way that a floor plan is a horizontal section viewed from above. In the section view, everything cut by the section plane is shown as a bold line, often with a solid fill to show objects cut through, while anything seen beyond is generally shown with a thinner line. Sections are used to describe the relationship between different levels of a building.

In the Observatorium drawing illustrated here, the section shows the outer dome, a second dome visible only inside the building, and the way the space between the two accommodates a large astronomical telescope. These relationships would be difficult to understand from a plan or elevation alone.

A sectional elevation is a combination of a cross section and elevations of other parts of a building seen beyond the section plane. Geometrically, a cross section is a horizontal orthographic projection of a building onto a vertical plane, with the vertical plane cutting through the building.

=== Isometric and axonometric projections ===
Isometric and axonometric projections are simple ways of representing a three-dimensional object, keeping the elements to scale and showing the relationship between several sides of the same object so that the complexities of a shape can be understood.

There is some confusion over the distinction between the terms isometric and axonometric. Alan Piper wrote that "axonometric is a word that has been used by architects for hundreds of years" and that engineers use the word axonometric as a generic term including isometric, diametric and trimetric drawings. This article uses the terms in the architecture-specific sense.

In practical drafting, the difference between isometric and axonometric is simple. In both, the plan is drawn on a skewed or rotated grid, and the verticals are projected vertically on the page. All lines are drawn to scale so that relationships between elements are accurate. In many cases, a different scale is required for different axes, and this can be calculated or estimated by eye.

- An isometric uses a plan grid at 30 degrees from the horizontal in both directions, which distorts the plan shape. Isometric graph paper can be used to construct this kind of drawing. This view is useful for explaining construction details, such as three-dimensional joints in joinery. The isometric was the standard view until the mid-twentieth century and remained popular until the 1970s, especially for textbook diagrams and illustrations.
- Cabinet projection is similar, but only one axis is skewed, while the others are horizontal and vertical. Originally used in cabinet making, it has the advantage that a principal side, such as a cabinet front, is displayed without distortion, so only the less important sides are skewed. The lines leading away from the eye are drawn at a reduced scale to lessen the degree of distortion. Cabinet projection is seen in Victorian engraved advertisements and architectural textbooks, but has largely disappeared from general use.
- An axonometric uses a 45-degree plan grid, which keeps the original orthogonal geometry of the plan. The advantage of this view for architecture is that the drafter can work directly from a plan, without having to reconstruct it on a skewed grid. In theory, the plan should be set at 45 degrees, but this can introduce confusing coincidences where opposite corners align. Unwanted effects can be avoided by rotating the plan while still projecting vertically. This is sometimes called a planometric or plan oblique view, and allows freedom to choose any suitable angle to present the most useful view of an object.

Traditional drafting techniques used 30–60 and 45 degree set squares, and this determined the angles used in these views. Once the adjustable square became common, those limitations were lifted.

The axonometric gained popularity in the twentieth century, not just as a convenient diagram but as a formal presentation technique, adopted in particular by the Modern Movement. Axonometric drawings feature prominently in influential 1970s drawings by Michael Graves, James Stirling and others, using not only straightforward views but also worm's-eye views, unusual and exaggerated rotations of the plan, and exploded elements.

=== Detail drawings ===
Detail drawings show a small part of the construction at a larger scale, to show how component parts fit together. They are also used to show small surface details, such as decorative elements. Section drawings at large scale are a standard way of showing building construction details, typically showing complex junctions such as floor-to-wall junctions, window openings, eaves and roof apexes that cannot be clearly shown on a drawing that includes the full height of the building. A full set of construction details needs to show plan details as well as vertical section details. One detail is seldom produced in isolation: a set of details shows the information needed to understand the construction in three dimensions. Typical scales for details are 1:10, 1:5 and full size.

In traditional construction, many details were standardized, so fewer detail drawings were required to construct a building. For example, the construction of a sash window could be left to the carpenter, who would understand what was required, while unique decorative details of the façade would be drawn up in detail. In contrast, modern buildings often need to be fully detailed because of the range of different products, methods and possible solutions.

== Architectural perspective ==
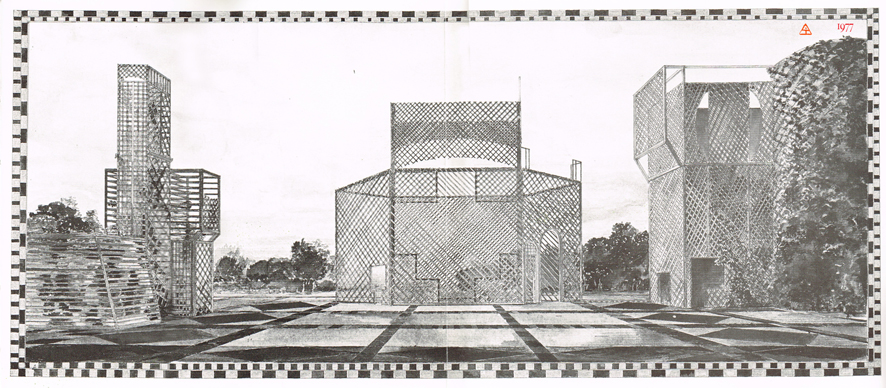
Perspective in the manner of the classic Ideal city by Jean-Max Albert, 1977

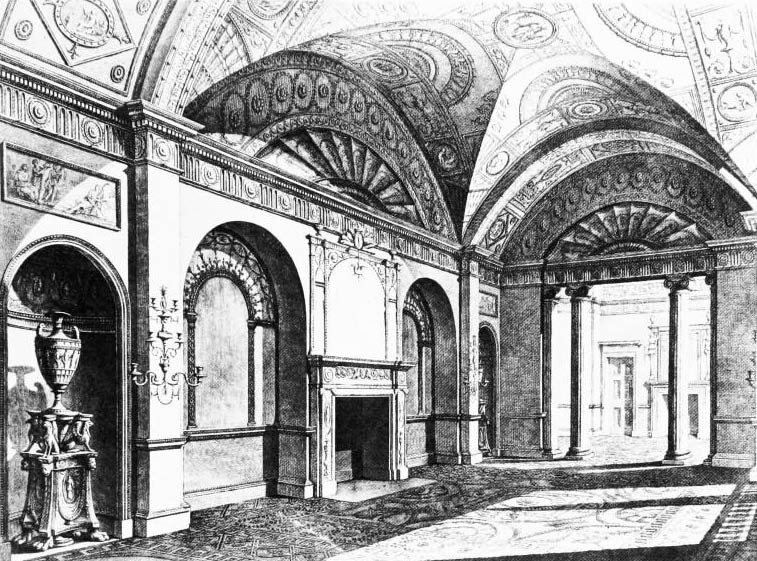
Two-point perspective, interior of Dercy House by Robert Adam, 1777

Perspective in drawing is an approximate representation on a flat surface of an image as it is perceived by the eye. The key concepts are:

- Perspective is the view from a particular fixed viewpoint.
- Horizontal and vertical edges in the object are represented by horizontals and verticals in the drawing.
- Lines leading away into the distance appear to converge at a vanishing point.
- All horizontals converge to a point on the horizon, which is a horizontal line at eye level.
- Verticals converge to a point either above or below the horizon.

The basic categorization of artificial perspective is by the number of vanishing points:

- One-point perspective, where objects facing the viewer are orthogonal and receding lines converge to a single vanishing point.
- Two-point perspective, which reduces distortion by viewing objects at an angle, with all horizontal lines receding to one of two vanishing points, both located on the horizon.
- Three-point perspective, which introduces additional realism by making the verticals recede to a third vanishing point, above or below the horizon depending on whether the view is seen from above or below.

The normal convention in architectural perspective is to use two-point perspective, with all verticals drawn as verticals on the page. Three-point perspective gives a more casual or photographic effect. In professional architectural photography, a view camera or a perspective control lens is used to eliminate the third vanishing point, so that all verticals are vertical in the photograph, as with the perspective convention. This can also be done by digital manipulation of a photograph taken with a standard lens.

Aerial perspective is a technique in painting that indicates distance by approximating the effect of the atmosphere on distant objects. In daylight, as an ordinary object gets farther from the eye, its contrast with the background is reduced, its color saturation is reduced, and its color becomes more blue. This should not be confused with an aerial view or bird's-eye view, which is the view as seen or imagined from a high vantage point.

In J. M. Gandy's perspective of the Bank of England, Gandy portrayed the building as a picturesque ruin in order to show the internal plan arrangement, a precursor of the cutaway view.

A montage image is produced by superimposing a perspective image of a building onto a photographic background. Care is needed to record the position from which the photograph was taken and to generate the perspective using the same viewpoint. This technique is popular in computer visualization, where the building can be photorealistically rendered and the final image is intended to be almost indistinguishable from a photograph.

== Sketches and diagrams ==
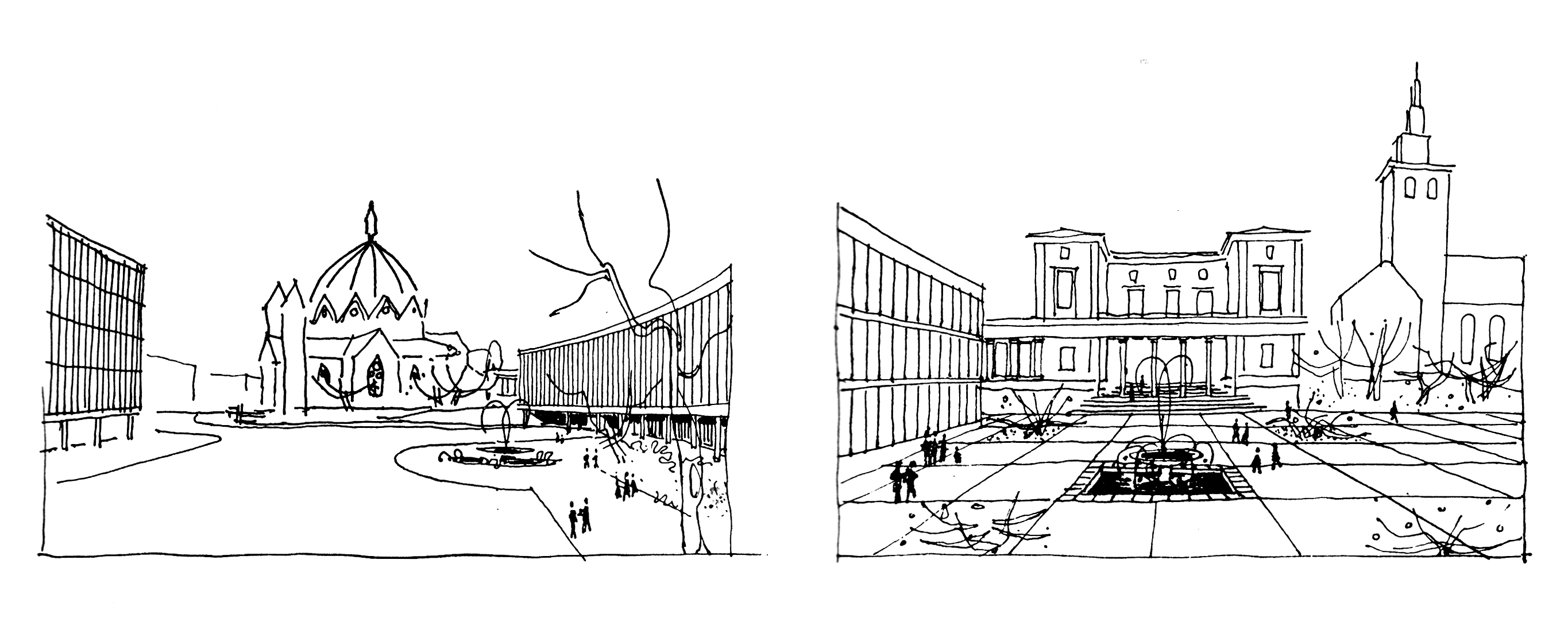
Architect's early concept sketches

A sketch is a rapidly executed freehand drawing, used as a quick way to record and develop an idea, rather than as a finished work. A diagram may also be drawn freehand, but uses symbols to develop the logic of a design. Both can be worked up into a more presentable form and used to communicate the principles of a design.

In architecture, the finished work is expensive and time-consuming, so it is important to resolve the design as fully as possible before construction begins. Complex modern buildings involve a large team of specialist disciplines, and communication at the early design stages is essential to keep the design moving toward a coordinated outcome. Architects and other designers start investigating a new design with sketches and diagrams to develop a rough design that responds to the particular design problems.

There are two basic elements to a building design: the aesthetic and the practical. The aesthetic element includes layout, visual appearance, materials and cultural references that may influence how people perceive the building. Practical concerns include space allocated for different activities, how people enter and move around the building, daylight and artificial lighting, acoustics, traffic noise, legal matters, building codes and many other issues. While both aspects are partly a matter of customary practice, every site is different. Many architects actively seek innovation, thereby increasing the number of problems to be resolved.

Architectural legend often refers to designs made on the back of an envelope or on a napkin. Initial thoughts are important, even if they are later discarded, because they can provide the central idea around which the design develops. Although a sketch is inaccurate, it is disposable and allows freedom of thought, enabling different ideas to be tried quickly. Choice becomes sharply reduced once the design is committed to a scale drawing, and the sketch stage is almost always essential.

Diagrams are mainly used to resolve practical matters. In the early phases of design, architects use diagrams to develop, explore and communicate ideas and solutions. They are essential tools for thinking, problem solving and communication in the design disciplines. Diagrams can be used to resolve spatial relationships, but they can also represent forces and flows, such as the forces of sun and wind or the flows of people and materials through a building.

An exploded view diagram shows component parts separated in some way, so that each can be seen on its own. These views are common in technical manuals, but are also used in architecture, either in conceptual diagrams or to illustrate technical details. In a cutaway view, parts of the exterior are omitted to show the interior or details of internal construction. Although common in technical illustration, including many building products and systems, the cutaway is less commonly used in architectural drawing.

== Types ==
Architectural drawings are produced for specific purposes and can be classified accordingly. Several elements are often included on the same sheet, for example a sheet showing a plan together with the principal façade.

=== Presentation drawings ===
Presentation drawings are intended to explain a scheme and show its merits. They may include tones or hatching to emphasize different materials, but they are diagrams rather than realistic images. Basic presentation drawings typically include people, vehicles and trees, often taken from a library of such images, and are otherwise similar in style to working drawings. Rendering is the art of adding surface textures and shadows to show the visual qualities of a building more realistically. An architectural illustrator or graphic designer may be employed to prepare specialist presentation images, usually perspectives or highly finished site plans, floor plans and elevations.

=== Survey drawings ===
Survey drawings are measured drawings of existing land, structures and buildings. Architects need an accurate set of survey drawings as a basis for their working drawings, to establish exact dimensions for construction work. Surveys are usually measured and drawn up by specialist land surveyors.

=== Record drawings ===
Historically, architects have made record drawings in order to understand and emulate architecture known to them. In the Renaissance, architects from across Europe studied and recorded the remains of Roman and Greek civilizations, and used these influences to develop the architecture of the period. Records are made both individually, for local purposes, and on a large scale for publication. Historic surveys worth referring to include:

- Colen Campbell's Vitruvius Brittanicus, illustrations of English buildings by Inigo Jones, Sir Christopher Wren, Campbell himself and other prominent architects of the era.
- The Survey of London, founded in 1894 by Charles Robert Ashbee and now available through English Heritage, a record of notable streets and individual buildings in the former County of London.
- The Historic American Buildings Survey, a record of notable buildings drawn up during the 1930s Depression, held by the Library of Congress and available on the internet.

Record drawings are also used in construction projects, where "as-built" conditions of the completed building are documented to account for variations made during construction.

=== Working drawings ===
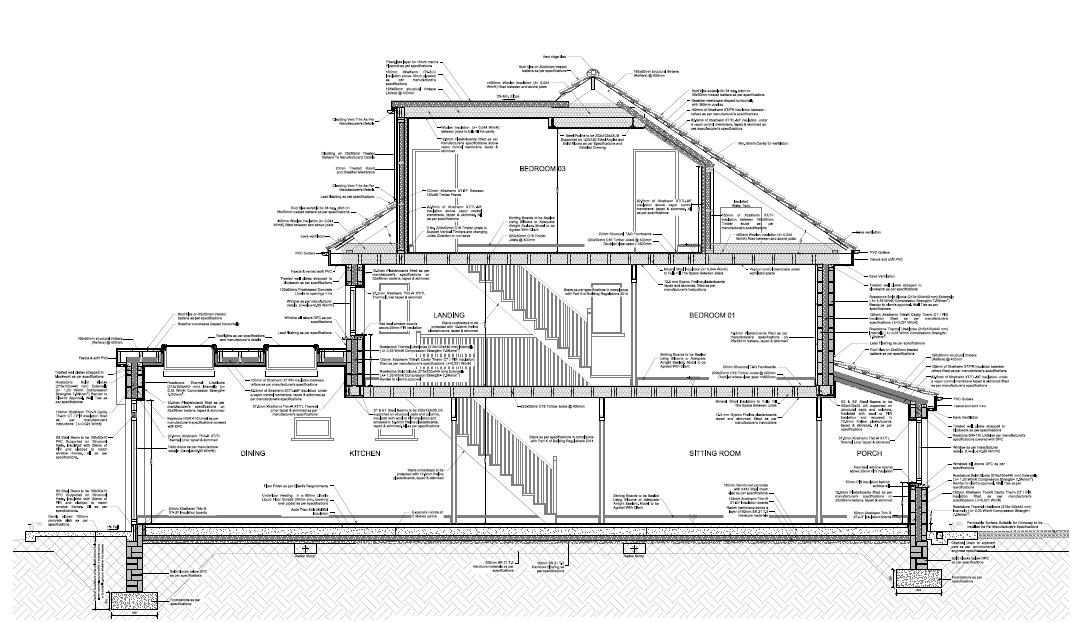
Detailed section drawing

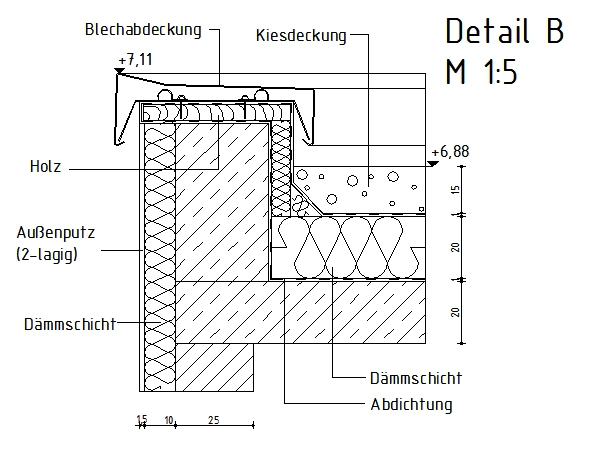
Detailed parapet wall drawing

A comprehensive set of drawings used in a building construction project includes not only architect's drawings, but also structural and other engineering drawings. Working drawings are commonly subdivided into location, assembly and component drawings.

- Location drawings, also called general arrangement drawings, include floor plans, sections and elevations. They show where construction elements are located.
- Assembly drawings show how different parts are put together. For example, a wall detail will show the layers that make up the construction, how they are fixed to structural elements, how the edges of openings are finished and how prefabricated components are fitted.
- Component drawings enable self-contained elements, such as windows and door sets, to be fabricated in a workshop and delivered to site complete and ready for installation. Larger components may include roof trusses, cladding panels, cupboards and kitchens. Complete rooms, especially hotel bedrooms and bathrooms, may be made as prefabricated pods complete with internal decorations and fittings.

Formerly, working drawings would typically combine plans, sections, elevations and some details to provide a complete explanation of a building on one sheet. That was possible because little detail was included and building techniques involved common knowledge among building professionals. Modern working drawings are much more detailed, and it is standard practice to isolate selected areas of a project on separate sheets. Notes included on drawings are brief and refer to standardized specification documents for more information. Understanding the layout and construction of a modern building involves studying a substantial set of drawings and documents.

== Drafting ==
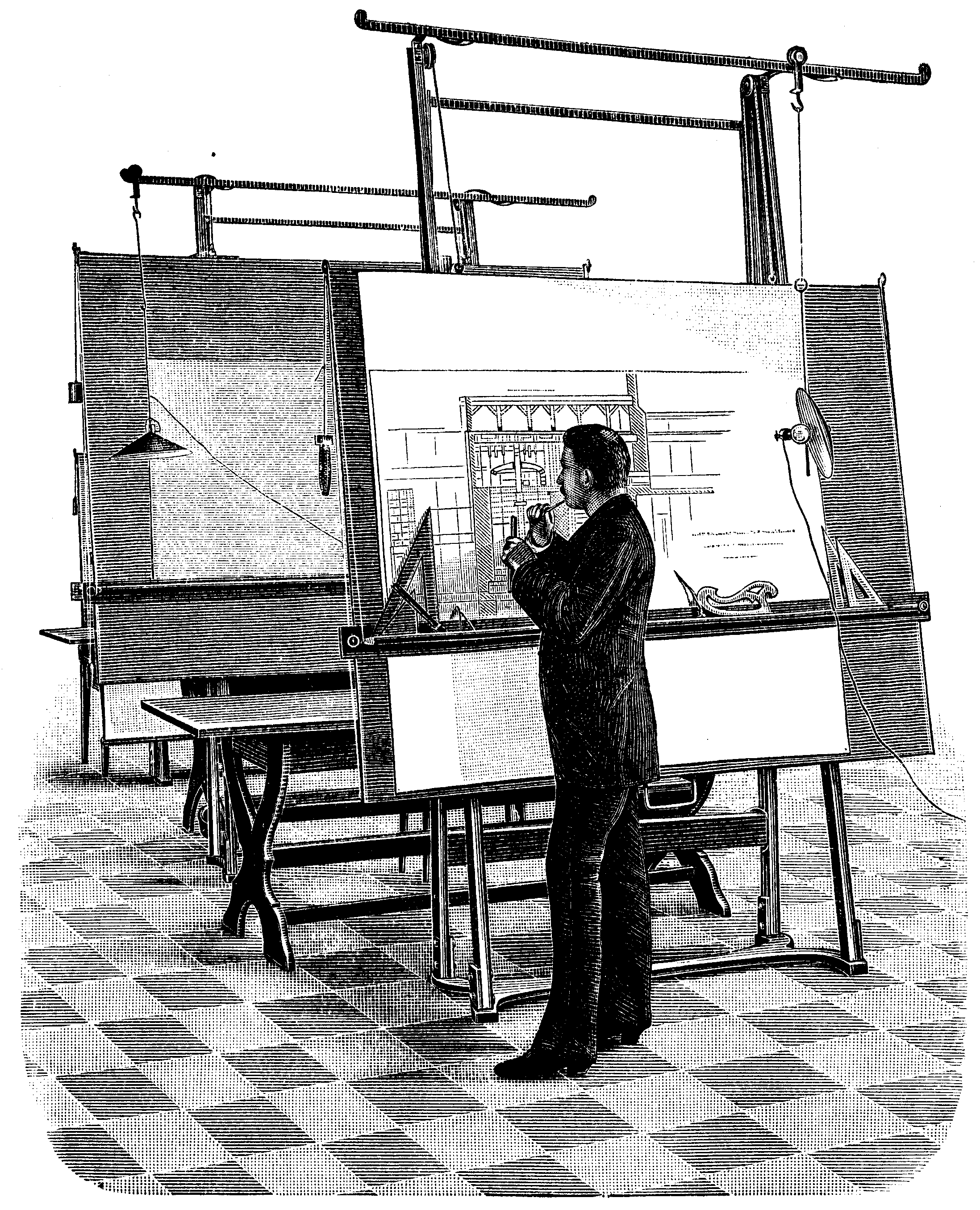
Architect at his drawing board, 1893

Until the latter part of the 20th century, architectural drawings were manually produced, either by architects or by trained draftsmen or drafters. Draftsmen did not usually generate the design, but made many of the less important decisions. This system has continued with CAD drafting, as many design architects have little or no knowledge of CAD software programs and rely on others to take their designs beyond the sketch stage. Draftsmen often specialize in a type of structure, such as residential or commercial, or in a type of construction, such as timber frame, reinforced concrete or prefabrication.

The traditional tools of the architect were the drawing board or drafting table, T-square, set squares, protractor, compasses, pencil and drawing pens of different types. Drawings were made on vellum, coated linen and tracing paper. Lettering was done by hand, mechanically using a stencil, or by a combination of the two. Ink lines were drawn with a ruling pen, a device similar to a dip pen but with adjustable line width. Ink pens had to be dipped into ink frequently. Draftsmen worked standing up, keeping the ink on a separate table to avoid spilling ink on the drawing.

Developments in the 20th century included the parallel motion drawing board, as well as more complex improvements on the basic T-square. The development of reliable technical drawing pens allowed faster drafting and stenciled lettering. Letraset dry transfer lettering and half-tone sheets were popular from the 1970s until computers made those processes obsolete.

=== CGI and computer-aided design ===
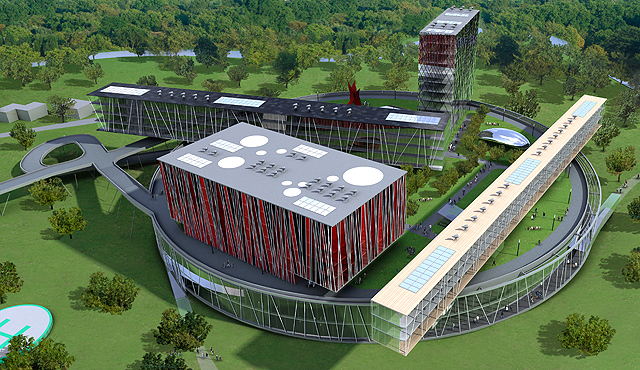
Computer-generated perspective of the Moscow School of Management, by David Adjaye

Computer-aided design, generally referred to by the acronym CAD, is the use of computer software to create drawings. Today, most technical drawings of all kinds are made using CAD. Instead of drawing lines on paper, the computer records equivalent information electronically. There are many advantages to this system: repetition is reduced because complex elements can be copied, duplicated and stored for reuse; errors can be deleted; and the speed of drafting allows many permutations to be tried before the design is finalized. On the other hand, CAD drawing can encourage a proliferation of detail and increased expectations of accuracy, which may reduce the efficiency originally expected from the move to computerization.

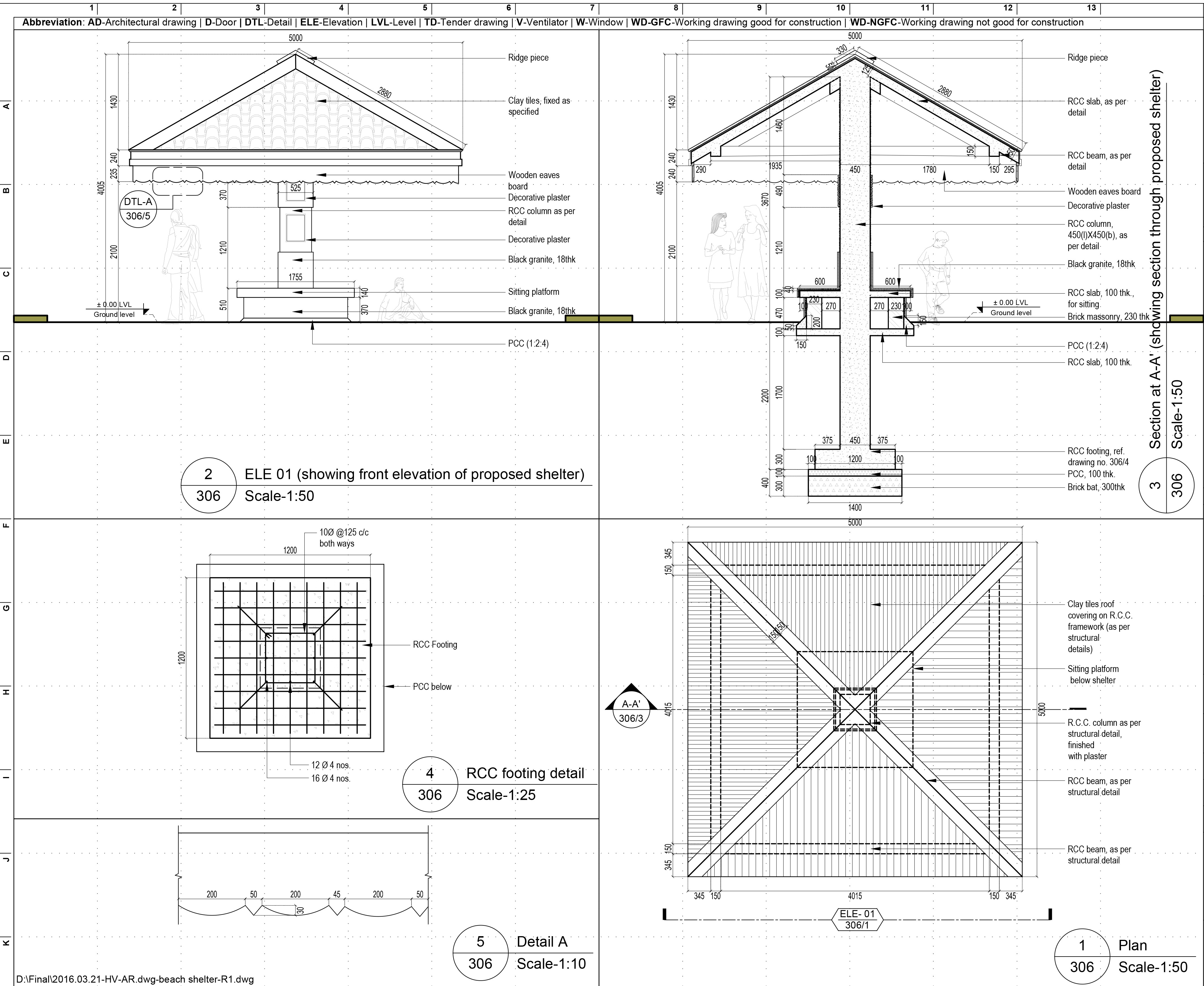
An example of a drawing drafted in AutoCAD

Professional CAD software such as AutoCAD is complex and requires both training and experience before the operator becomes fully productive. Consequently, skilled CAD operators are often separated from the design process. Simpler software such as SketchUp and Vectorworks allows for more intuitive drawing and is intended as a design tool.

CAD is used to create all kinds of drawings, from working drawings to photorealistic perspective views. Architectural renderings, also called visualizations, are made by creating a three-dimensional model using CAD. The model can be viewed from any direction to find useful viewpoints. Different software, such as Autodesk 3ds Max, is then used to apply color and texture to surfaces and to represent shadows and reflections. The result can be combined with photographic elements such as people, cars and background landscapes.

==== Building information modeling ====
Building information modeling (BIM) is a development of CAD drawing. The design team collaborates to create a three-dimensional computer model, and plans and other two-dimensional views are generated directly from the model, ensuring spatial consistency. The key innovation is to share the model through a network so that design functions, such as site survey, architecture, structure and services, can be integrated into a single model or into related models shared throughout the design development process. Some form of management, not necessarily by the architect, is needed to resolve conflicting priorities. The starting point of BIM is spatial design, but it also enables components to be quantified and scheduled directly from information embedded in the model.

Building information modeling is sometimes described through different levels of maturity. These levels indicate the degree of collaboration and information sharing in a project. Level 0 is based on individual work with little collaboration. Level 1 combines 2D and 3D work, with project teams required to manage and share data. Level 2 involves team members using 3D models, although they may not all use the same information model. Level 3 involves a shared project model in a central environment that can be modified by project participants.

==== Parametric design ====
Parametric design is a method of creating relationships between elements in a model. Measurements and parameters are connected by scripts or rules, so that changing one measurement can affect other measurements based on the set parameters. Parametric design allows for scalable adjustments and complex organic forms. It can create forms that would not be possible with regular three-dimensional modeling, or would take a large amount of time to model manually. Models can reduce production time, allowing more time for other parts of the design process. One debate around parametric design concerns whether complex forms properly respond to user needs and practical requirements.

Examples associated with parametric design include Metropol Parasol in Seville and Canton Tower in Guangzhou, China. Such forms often use complex repetitive patterns that twist, bend or curve. The term "parametricism" has been associated with Zaha Hadid and digital design techniques.

==== Architectural animation ====
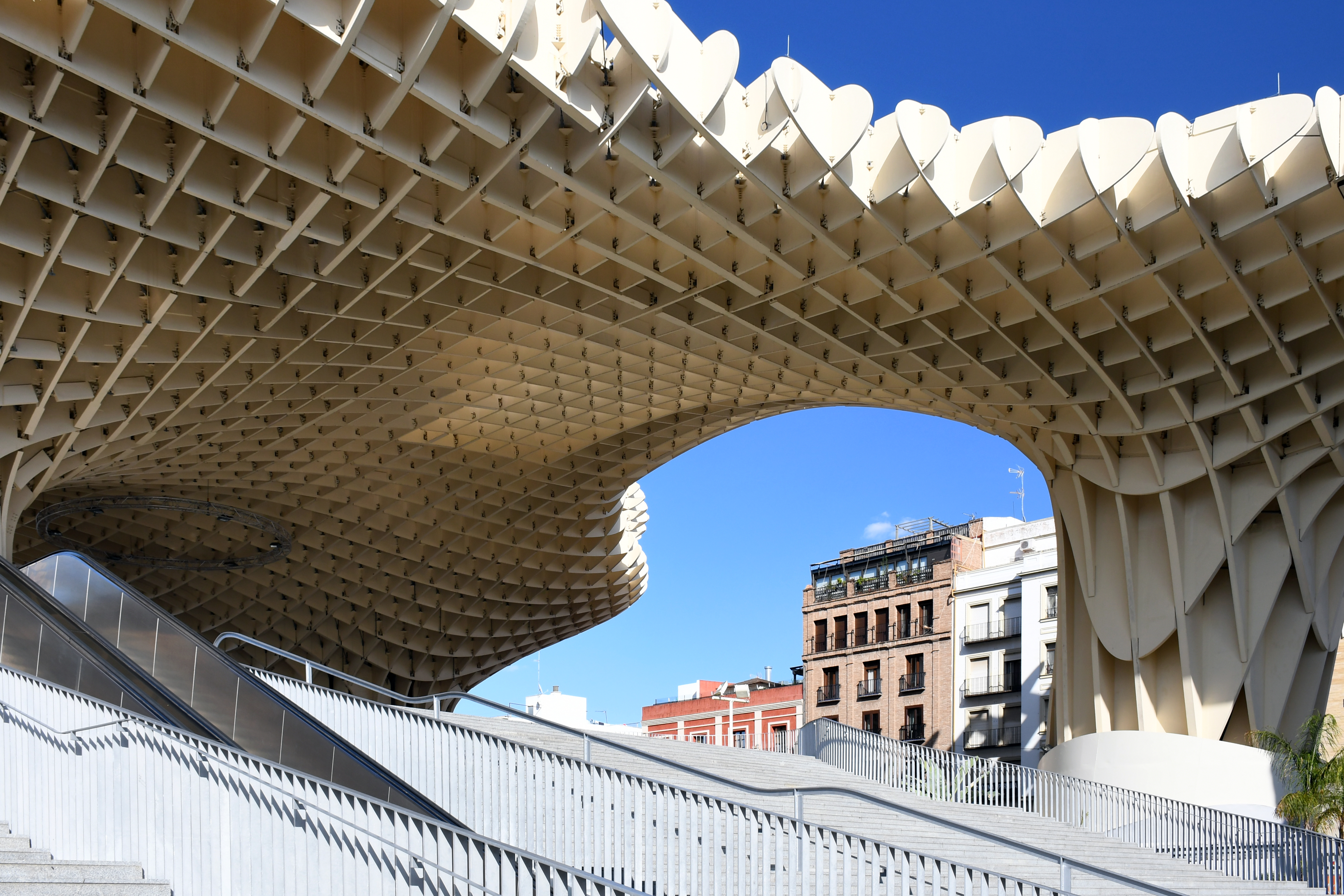
Example of a real-life parametric model

An architectural animation is a short film showing how a proposed building will look. Moving images make three-dimensional forms easier to understand. An animation is generated from a series of hundreds or thousands of still images, each made in the same way as an architectural visualization. A computer-generated building is created using CAD software and used to create more or less realistic views from a sequence of viewpoints. The simplest animations use a moving viewpoint, while more complex animations can include moving objects such as people and vehicles.

== Digital era ==
Architectural drawing has changed significantly as computer-aided design, digital modeling and networked collaboration have become more common. Although manual drafting is less common in professional practice, architects are still trained to think through design problems visually and to understand user needs, site conditions and cultural context. Human-centered design considers the human perspective throughout the design process.

=== Virtual reality ===
Virtual reality in architectural projects can help designers and clients understand spaces from a user's perspective. The use of motion tracking allows for interactive manipulation and can create an individual viewing experience. Architecture firms may use VR as a tool for internal review, client presentations and design communication. Potential benefits include spatial understanding, reduced revisions and the ability to simulate real-world scenarios before construction.

=== Online practices ===
During and after the COVID-19 pandemic, architecture firms increasingly used digital tools for collaboration. Video conferencing programs such as Zoom became common for meetings with clients and colleagues. Coordination can be difficult when teams are distributed, but programs such as BIM can help improve workflow between architects, consultants and clients. Digital collaboration also changes client communication because some forms of physical review, such as touching materials or reviewing printed drawings together, may be reduced.

== Architectural reprographics ==
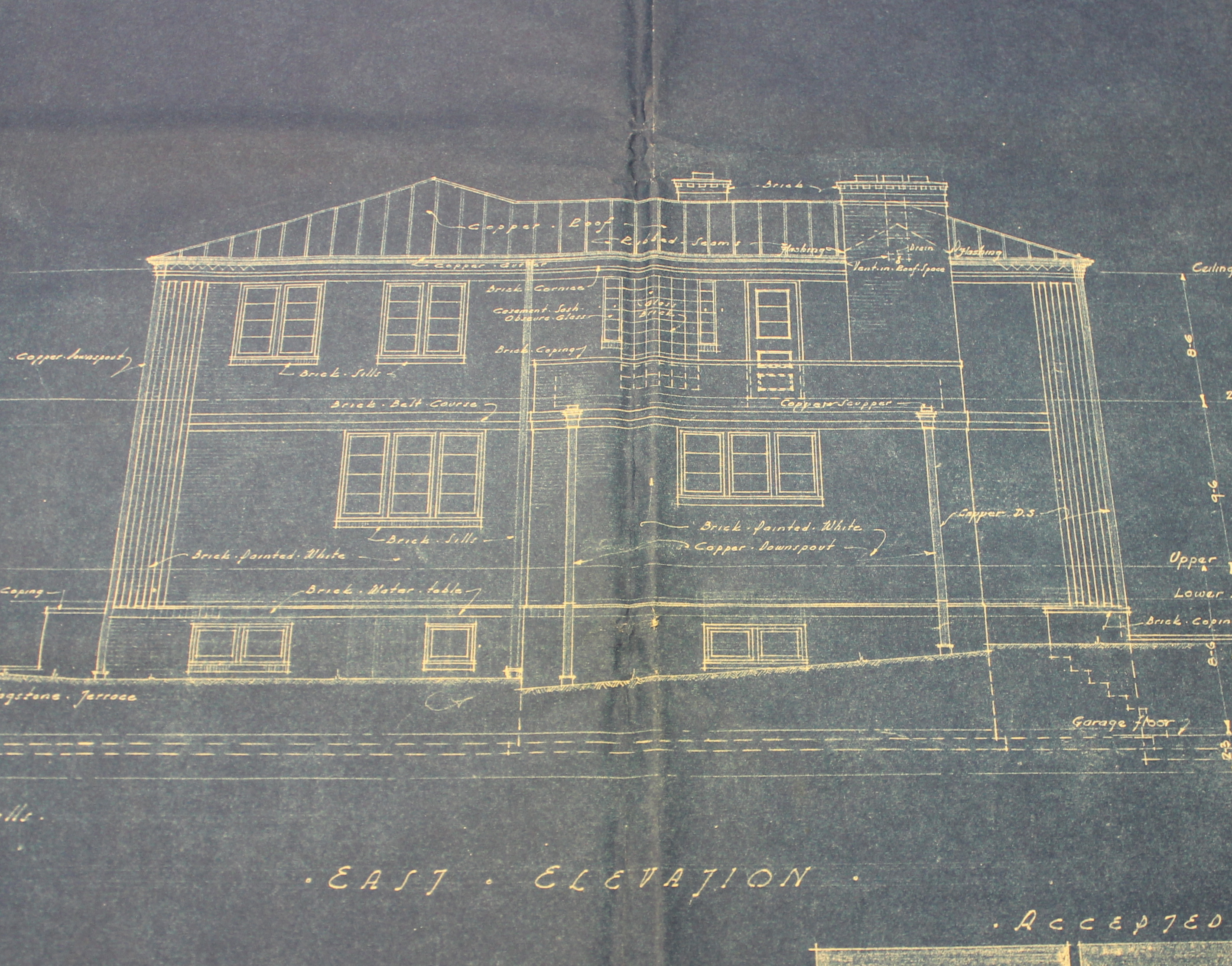
Blueprint

Reprographics or reprography covers a variety of technologies, media and support services used to make multiple copies of original drawings. Prints of architectural drawings are still sometimes called blueprints, after one of the early processes that produced a white line on blue paper. The process was superseded by the dye-line print system, which prints black on white coated paper (Whiteprint). The standard modern processes are the inkjet printer, laser printer and photocopier, of which inkjet and laser printers are commonly used for large-format printing. Although color printing is now commonplace, it remains expensive above A3 size, and architects' working drawings still often use black and white or greyscale.

== See also ==
- Architectural model
- Copyright in architecture in the United States
- Drawing
- Engineering drawing
- Layers in a standard architectural drawing
- Linear scale
- List of museums with major collections of European prints and drawings
- Museum for Architectural Drawing, Berlin, Germany
- Multiview orthographic projection
- Preservation (library and archive)
- Structural drawing
- Technical drawing
