= Kupferstichkabinett =

Kupferstichkabinett is the German word for print room. It may also refer to:

- Kupferstichkabinett Berlin
- Kupferstich-Kabinett (Dresden)
