= FSAI =

FSAI may refer to:

- Florida Student Association, Inc.
- Food Safety Authority of Ireland
- Fellow of the Society of Architectural Illustration
- Factorized Sparse Approximate Inverse, a kind of preconditioner, an application transformation procedure in linear algebra
- Fire and Security Association of India
