= Hugh Ferriss Memorial Prize =

The Hugh Ferriss Memorial Prize is awarded by the American Society of Architectural Illustrators in recognition of excellence in the graphic representation of architecture. It is the Society's highest award.

Named in honor of American architect Hugh Ferriss, the medal features Ferriss’s original "Forth Stage" drawing, executed in bronze.

== List of winners ==
- AIP 40, 2026 - Henry Penghui Zhang, Elkus Manfredi Architects
- AIP 39, 2025 - Kilograph
- AIP 38, 2024 - Kenta Miyakawa
- AIP 37, 2022 - Jose Trinidad
- AIP 36, 2021 - Vic nguyen, Viet Nam
- AIP 35, 2020 - Dennis Allain
- AIP 34, 2019 - Corey Harper, TILTPIXEL
- AIP 33, 2018 - Tamas Medve
- AIP 32, 2017 -
- AIP 31, 2016 -
- AIP 30, 2015 - Midori Watanabe
- AIP 29, 2014 - Hao La, Neoscape
- AIP 28, 2013 - Jason Addy, Neoscape
- AIP 27, 2012 - Aleksander Novak-Zemplinski
- AIP 26, 2011 - Marcel Schaufelberger
- AIP 25, 2010 - Jon Kletzien
- AIP 24, 2009 - Maarten van Dooren
- AIP 23, 2008 - Frank Costantino
- AIP 22, 2007 - Ana Carolina Monnaco
- AIP 21, 2006 - Dennis Allain
- AIP 20, 2005 - Christopher Grubbs
- AIP 19, 2004 - Michael Reardon
- AIP 18, 2003 - Ronald J Love
- AIP 17, 2002 - Gilbert Gorski
- AIP 16, 2001 - Michael McCann
- AIP 15, 2000 - Thomas W. Schaller
- AIP 14, 1999 - Serge Zaleski
- AIP 13, 1998 - Wei Li
- AIP 12, 1997 - Advanced Media Design
- AIP 11, 1996 - Paul Stevenson Oles
- AIP 10, 1995 - Lee Dunnette
- AIP 9, 1994 - Rael D. Slutsky
- AIP 8, 1993 - David Sylvester
- AIP 7, 1992 - Douglas E. Jamieson
- AIP 6, 1991 - Luis Blanc
- AIP 5, 1990 - Gilbert Gorski
- AIP 4, 1989 - Daniel Willis
- AIP 3, 1988 - Thomas W. Schaller
- AIP 2, 1987 - Richard Lovelace
- AIP 1, 1986 - James Record
- AIP 1, 1986 - Lee Dunnette

== Sources ==
- Award Winner Gallery
- American Society of Architectural Illustrators Official Website
- Previous Hugh Ferriss Winners
