= List of museums with major collections of European prints and drawings =

This is a list of museums or print rooms with major collections of European old master prints and drawings. This list is incomplete, and should not be regarded as a correct ranking of the major collections.

1. Bibliothèque nationale de France, Paris, France
  200 000 drawings, 10 millions prints
2. British Museum, London, England
  50,000 drawings, 2 million prints
3. The Metropolitan Museum of Art *, New York, US
  15,000 drawings, 1.5 million prints
4. Albertina, Vienna, Austria
  50,000 drawings, 1 million prints Excludes 25,000 architectural drawings
5. Kupferstichkabinett, Berlin, Germany
  110,000 drawings, 500,000 prints
6. Royal Library of Belgium, Brussels, Belgium
  Over 20,000 drawings and 700,000 prints
7. State Hermitage, St. Petersburg, Russia
  39,000 drawings, 486,000 prints
8. Victoria & Albert Museum, London, England
  2,000 drawings, 500,000 prints Excludes 600,000 architectural drawings, 100,000 design drawings and 10,000 British drawings (V&A Collecting Plan Including Acquisition & Disposal Policy, August 2004)
9. Rijksmuseum, Amsterdam, Netherlands
  Over 500,000 prints and drawings
10. National Gallery in Prague, Collection of Prints and Drawings, Prague, Czech Republic
  60,000 drawings, 400,000 prints
11. Bibliothèque Municipale, Lyon, France
  203,500 prints
12. Cabinet des estampes et des dessins, Strasbourg, France
  Over 200,000 prints and drawings
13. Fitzwilliam Museum, Cambridge, England
  20,000 drawings, 180,000 prints
14. Royal Collection, London, England
  40,000 drawings, 150,000 prints Including 600 drawings by Leonardo da Vinci
15. Musée du Louvre, Paris, France
  140,500 drawings, 43,000 prints The main print collection is at the Bibliothèque nationale de France.
16. Uffizi, Florence, Italy
  177,000 drawings and prints
17. Philadelphia Museum of Art, Philadelphia, US
  150,000 drawings and prints
18. École nationale supérieure des Beaux-Arts, Paris, France
  20,000 drawings, 100,000 prints. Excludes 45,000 architectural drawings
19. National Gallery of Art, Washington, US
  105,000 drawings and prints
20. Bibliothèque de l'Arsenal, Paris, France
  100,000 prints
21. Art Institute of Chicago, Chicago, US
  11,500 drawings, 60,000 prints
22. Musée des Beaux-Arts, Dijon, France
  10,500 drawings, 60,0000 prints
23. Musée des Beaux-Arts, Orléans, France
  10,000 drawings, 50,000 prints
24. Museum of Modern Art, New York, US
  6,000 drawings, 50,000 prints
25. Brooklyn Museum, New York, US
  2,000 drawings, 40,000 prints
26. Museo del Prado, Madrid, Spain
  9,000 drawings, 6,000 prints. The main drawing and print collection is at the Biblioteca Nacional de España.
27. Zelandia Illustrata, Amsterdam, Netherlands
  18,000 maps, prints, drawings, photographs, glass negatives, slides and postcards
28. Museo ABC de Dibujo e Ilustración, Madrid, Spain
  200,000 drawings and illustrations by 1,500 artists from 1891 up to the present
29. Museum Boijmans van Beuningen, Rotterdam, The Netherlands
  17,000 drawings, 60,000 to 70,000 prints
30. Hamburger Kunsthalle, Hamburg, Germany
  130,000 prints and drawings
31. Teylers Museum Haarlem, The Netherlands
32. Städel Museum, Frankfurt am Main, Germany
  100,000 prints and drawings
33. Museum of Fine Arts Budapest, Budapest, Hungary
  100,000 prints, 10,000 drawings
34. National Art Museum of Catalonia, Barcelona, Spain
  50,000 drawings, 70,000 prints
35. Royal Academy of Fine Arts of San Fernando, Madrid, Spain
  15,300 drawings, 35,000 prints
36. Hispanic Society of America, New York, US
  6,000 drawings, 15,000 prints
37. Plantin-Moretus Museum, Antwerp, Belgium
  75,000 drawings and prints
38. Staatliche Graphische Sammlung München, Munich, Germany
  400,000 drawings and prints
