= American Society of Architectural Illustrators =

- Abbreviation: ASAI
- Formation: 1986
- Type: Professional organization
- Headquarters: Hebron, Maine, United States
- President: Carlos Cristerna
- Board of directors: 10
- Website: www.asai.org

The American Society of Architectural Illustrators (ASAI) is a professional organization representing the business and artistic interests of architectural illustrators throughout North America and around the world. ASAI's principal mandate is to foster of communication and networking among its members, raise the standards of architectural drawing, and bring awareness to the general public of this type of work and the value of their drawings as a conceptual and representational tool in architecture.

== History ==
The office for the ASAI moved from California to Maine in 2013.

Previous logo for the ASAI

A new website and logo debuted in 2016.

== Architecture in Perspective ==
Architecture In Perspective (AIP) is an international architectural competition that architectural representations for publications and exhibition. Architecture In Perspective is launched each year at the ASAI's annual convention. The Society's highest award, the Hugh Ferriss Memorial Prize is awarded each year in recognition of excellence in the graphic representation of architecture.

== Affiliations and advocacy ==
The ASAI has worked to establish an international network of delineators throughout the US, Canada, England, Europe, Japan, Australia, Korea, and other countries. Membership with the ASAI brings official affiliations with:

- Australian Association of Architectural Illustrators
- Japan Architectural Renderers Association
- Korean Architectural Perspectivists Association
- The American Institute of Architects
- The Architectural Society of China
- The New York Society of Renderers
- Society of Architectural Illustrators, United Kingdom
- Philippine Association of Architectural Renderers
- Design Communication Association, United States

In 2007, The American Society of Illustrators Partnership (ASIP) was established, with ASAI as one of the six founding organizations. The primary stated purpose of the ASIP was to educate its members and others regarding the rights of illustrators to receive royalties and licensing fees for the use of their work. Other member organizations of ASIP currently include:

- Illustrators Partnership of America
- Association of Medical Illustrators
- National Cartoonists Society
- Guild of Natural Science Illustrators
- San Francisco Society of Illustrators
- Pittsburgh Society of Illustrators
- American Society of Aviation Artists
- Society of Illustrators of San Diego
- Society of Illustrators of Los Angeles
- Illustrators Club of Washington DC, Maryland & Virginia
- Association of American Editorial Cartoonists
- and Illustrators-at-Large who are nonaffiliated

== See also ==
- Society of Architectural Illustrators (United Kingdom)
