= Architectural illustration =

Visual representation of a proposed architectural design

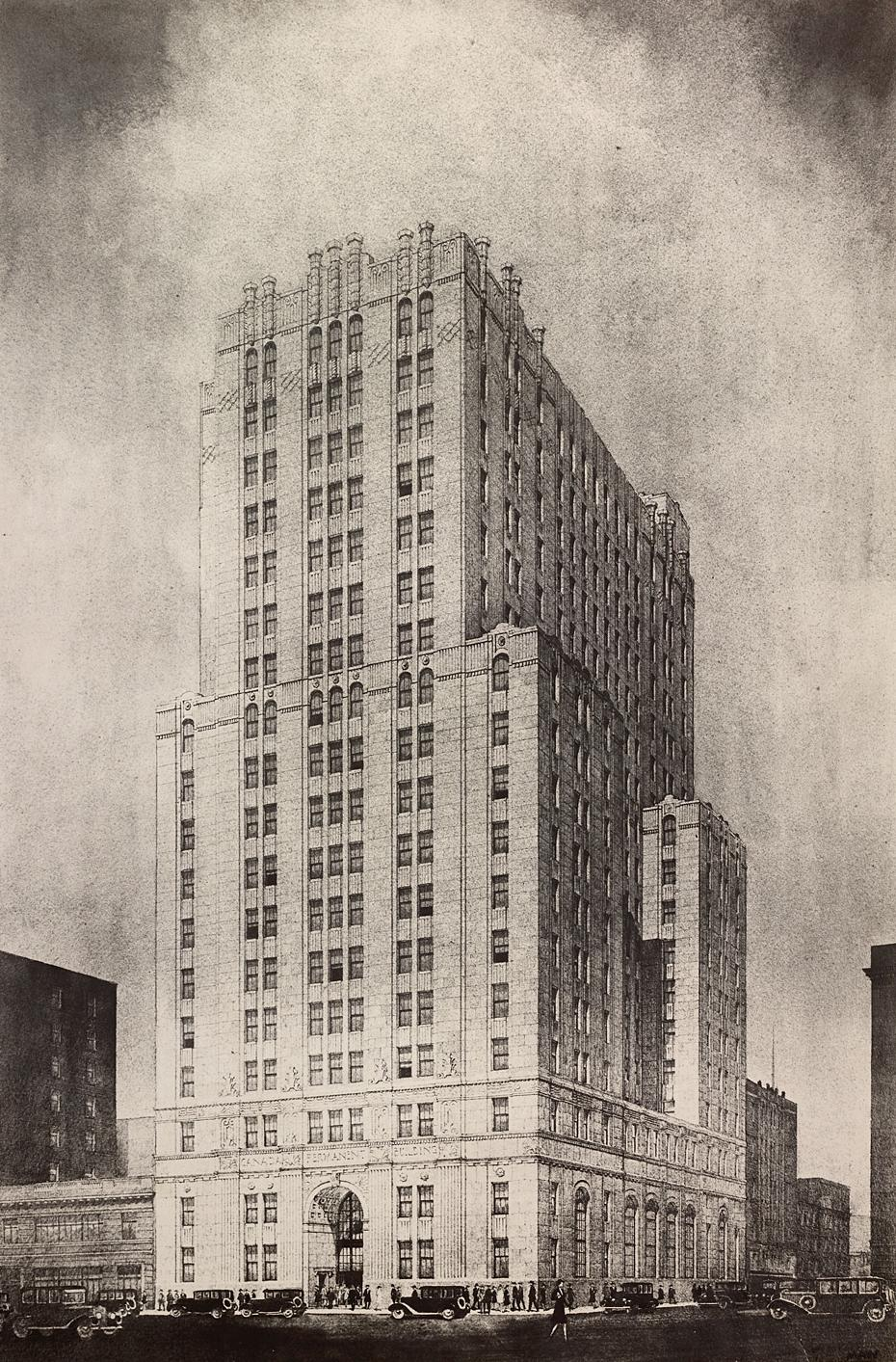
Architectural rendering of the Canada Permanent Trust Building, Toronto, Canada

Architectural illustration, architectural rendering, or architectural visualization (often abbreviated to archviz, sometimes stylized as ArchViz) is the art of creating images or animations illustrating the attributes of a proposed architectural design.

== Common types ==
Architectural renderings vary by output, view and style. They may include static images, animations, walkthroughs, virtual reality, exterior views, interior views, aerial views, photorealistic images, sketches, watercolor images or collage. These renderings help visualize buildings from concept to completion, and may focus on atmosphere, detail or technical aspects for different audiences.

=== Computer-generated renderings ===
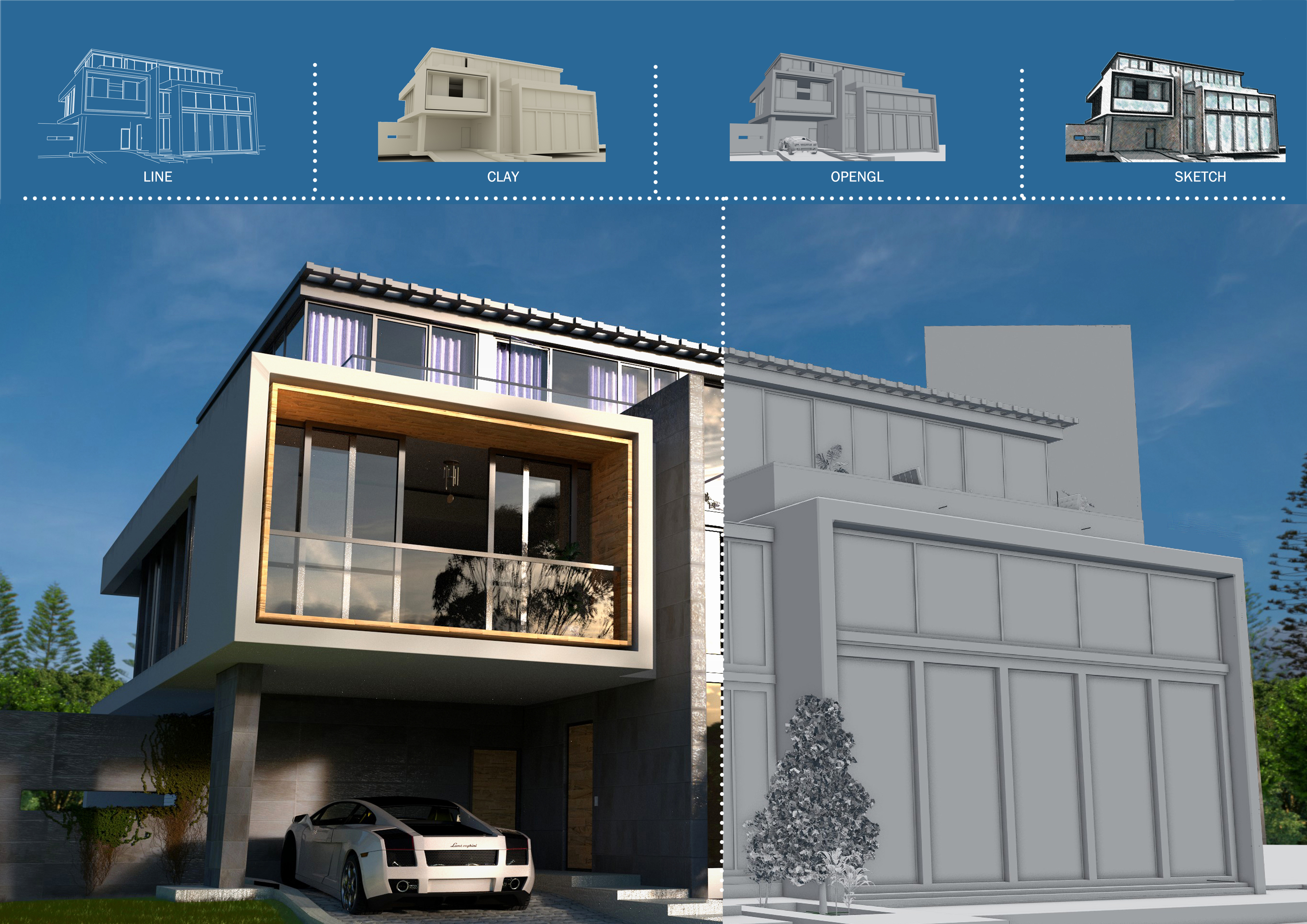
Digital architectural render made in Blender, showing different rendering styles

Images generated by a computer using three-dimensional modeling software or other computer software for presentation purposes are commonly termed "computer-generated renderings". Rendering techniques vary. Some methods create simple flat images or images with basic shadows. A common technique uses software to approximate lighting and materials, and is often referred to as a photorealistic rendering.

=== Hand-drawn illustrations ===
Until 3D computer modeling became common, architectural illustrations were generated by hand. Some architectural illustrators still create renderings entirely by hand, while others use a combination of hand drawing, painting and computer-generated color or linework. Common media for hand-drawn architectural renderings include watercolor, colored pencil, gouache, graphite and charcoal.

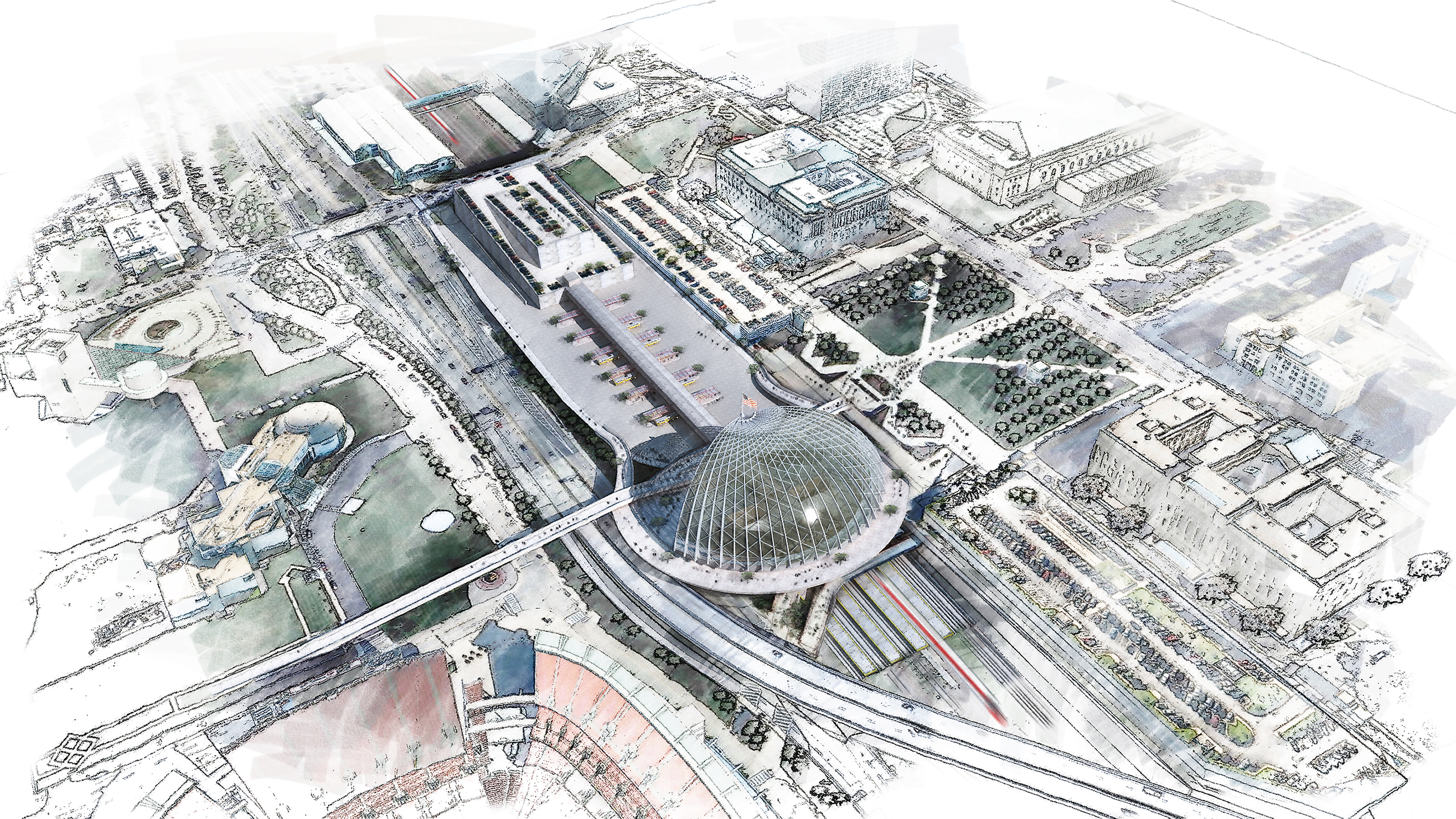
Hand-drawn planning render

== Education ==
Traditionally, rendering techniques were taught in a "master class" practice, such as the École des Beaux-Arts, where a student worked creatively with a mentor in the study of fine arts. Contemporary architects use hand-drawn sketches, pen and ink drawings, and watercolor renderings to represent their designs. Computer-generated graphics are also widely used by architectural illustrators.

During the past 20–30 years, many professional architectural illustrators came from an education in architecture first, then moved into the profession as their skills in illustration progressed.

== Occupation ==
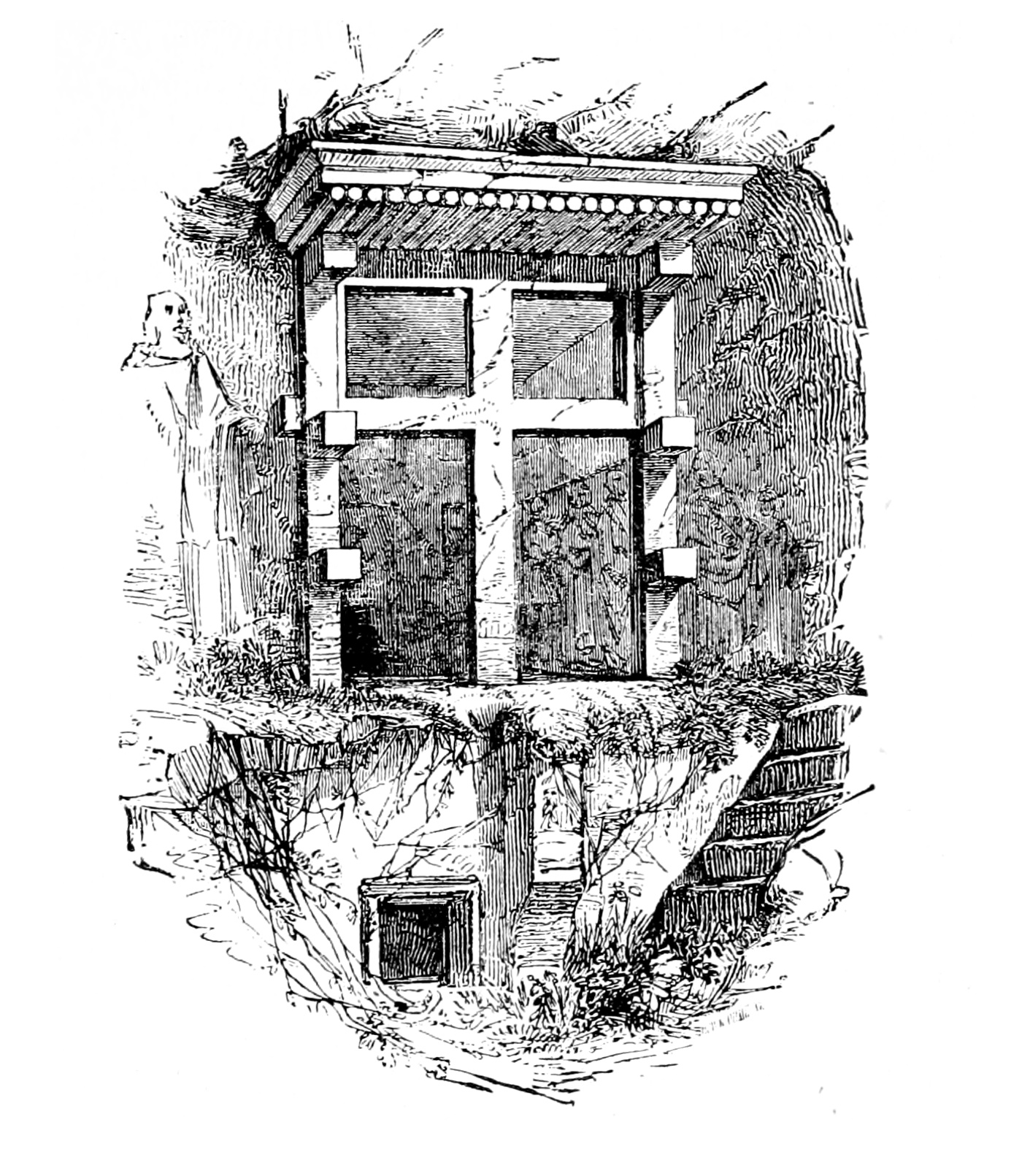
Illustrations from the book, A History of Architecture in All Countries, vol. I (1887), written and illustrated by James Fergusson.

An architectural illustrator is an artist who creates imagery for design professionals to portray the details of an architectural project. These images are used to communicate design ideas to clients, owners, committees, customers and the general public.

== Awards ==
- The Hugh Ferriss Memorial Prize is awarded by the American Society of Architectural Illustrators in recognition of excellence in the graphic representation of architecture. It is the society's highest award.
- The CGarchitect Architectural 3D Awards are awarded by CGarchitect.com in recognition of achievement in the field of computer-generated architectural rendering. The awards were started in 2004 and include categories such as Best Architectural Image, Best Architectural Film, Best Student Image, Best Student Film and Best Interactive Presentation/Emerging Technology.

== See also ==
- 3D rendering
- Rendering
- Software rendering
- 3D computer graphics
- Virtual home design software
- Architectural animation
- Concept art
- Museum for Architectural Drawing
