= Print room =

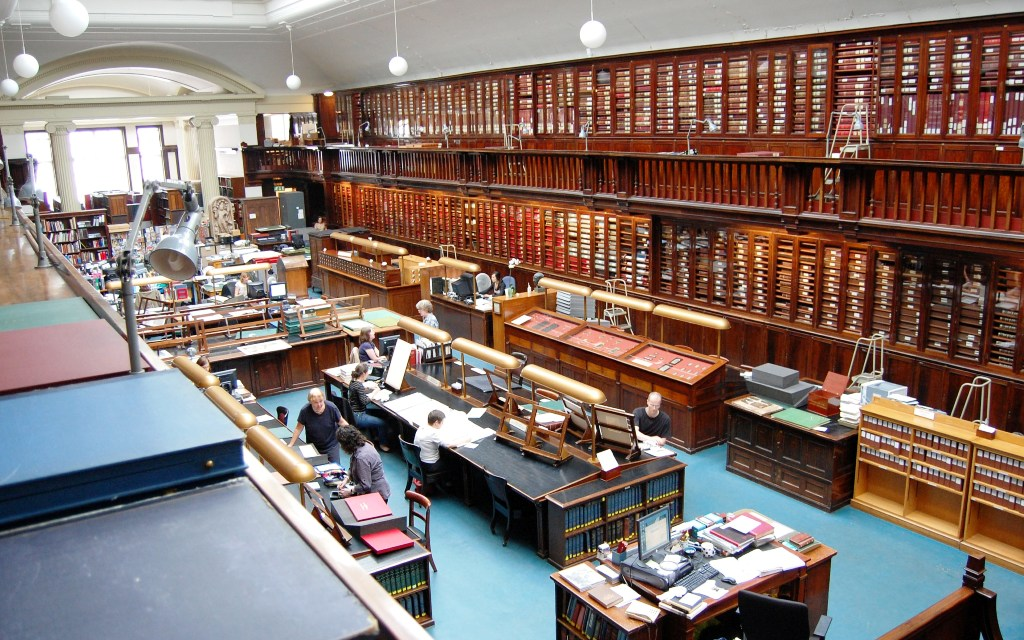
British Museum, Prints And Drawings Study Room

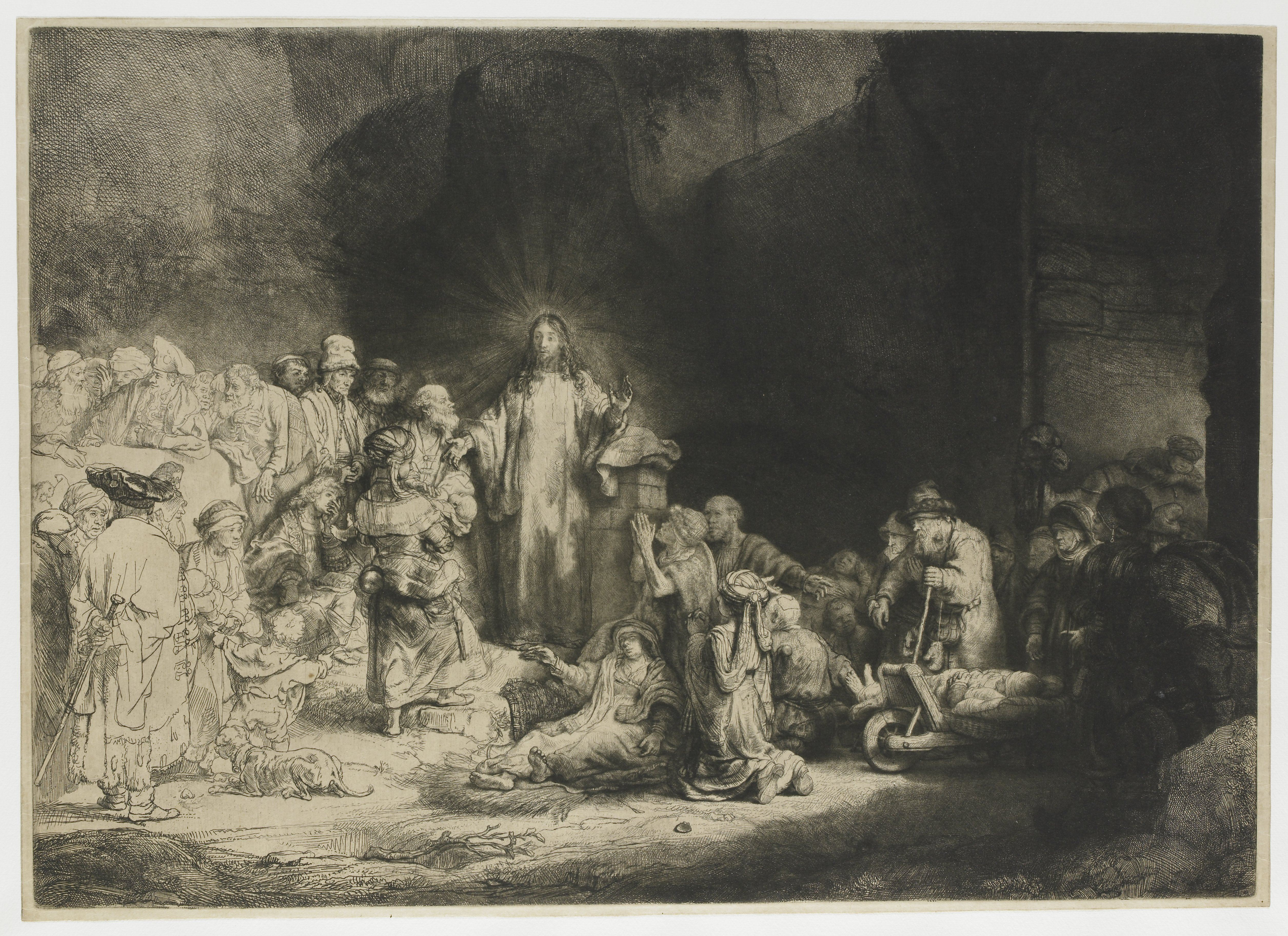
The Hundred Guilder Print, c.1647-1649, etching by Rembrandt. Most large print rooms have an example of this print

A print room is a room in an art gallery or museum where a collection of old master and modern prints, usually together with drawings, watercolours, and photographs, are held and viewed.

A further meaning is a room decorated by pasting prints onto the wall in a quasi-collage style to form a sort of wallpaper, an 18th-century fashion, of which several examples survive. One of the largest, though atypically the prints are cut out round shapes, that are pasted well spaced apart, is at The Vyne, Basingstoke, Hampshire.

== Appearance ==
For conservation reasons, works on paper cannot be permanently displayed, as light, temperature, and humidity conditions leave them vulnerable to damage, normally limiting an open display to no more than 6 months. They are kept in inert, acid-free boxes, albums, or portfolios behind closed doors; which considerations of space would dictate in any case for the vast majority. Where possible, they are mounted on archivally safe supports, but large collections still contain less important items loose in boxes. Storage may be in the same room as the viewing is done (the 'Reading-' or 'Study Room'), but as the largest collections have well over a million items stores are often located 'behind the scenes', along with the curators' offices. Typically, a large print room appears like a library reading room, and the visitor sits at a desk equipped with a stand or easel, fills in a request slip, and the material requested is brought out for them by curatorial staff, who are able to offer further information about works and artists. Visitors are often able to compare a selection of works by different artists, aiding connoisseurial study.

== Visiting ==
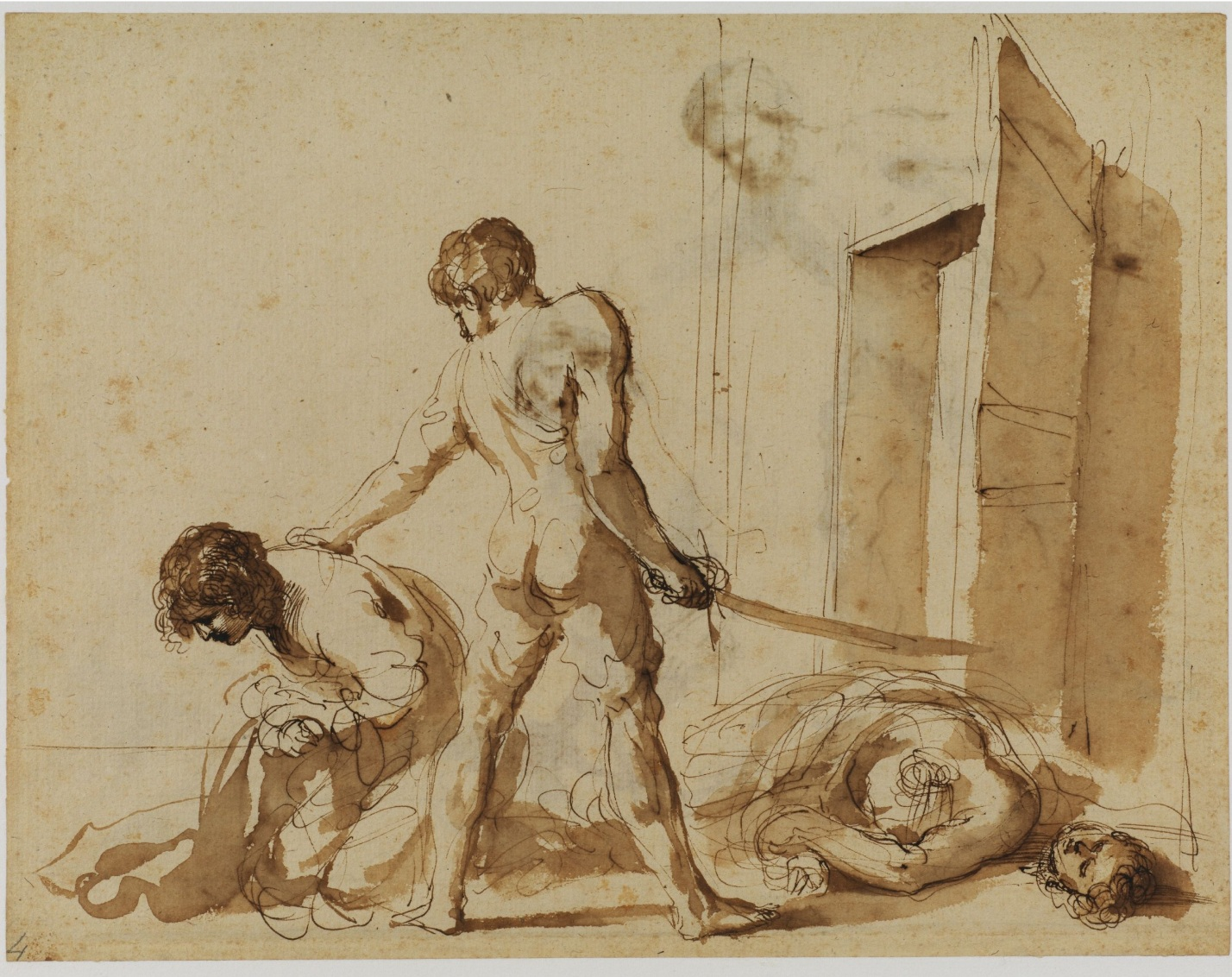
Drawing of martyrs John and Paul by Guercino, Courtauld Institute, London

Most national collections can be seen by the public more easily than is often realised. Usually, visitors of all sorts, whether researchers or not, are entitled to view works on paper not on display in the galleries, which will form the great majority of an institution's collection, thereby making print rooms an essential resource for enabling our understanding and appreciation of works on paper – in particular, how artists conceive of finished paintings through preparatory studies, and how printmaking traditions and techniques have evolved over the centuries. On a national level, print rooms tend to differ, each having their own specialism, though collections often overlap in content.

There are links to lists of print rooms at the end of this article; most lead to the gallery's or museum's web-pages, which explain visiting arrangements. In many cases, appointments need to be made in advance, and proof of identity should usually be provided. While it is helpful to outline what you would like to see (including artists' names and catalogue numbers, which may be available online or in books), visitors are also usually welcome to discuss their needs more casually by phoning or emailing in advance of their appointment. Not all material will be available to view, depending on current loans and exhibitions commitments and the condition of works. Some especially fragile or valuable items may not normally be available for viewing.

Within the print room, setting rules and regulations will vary from institution to institution. Some print rooms may allow visitors to photograph works (without a flash), while others may permit sketching. The V&A's Prints and Drawings Study Room allows photography but Tate Britain's Prints and Drawings Rooms do not, though Tate visitors are allowed to sketch and paint in watercolour with appropriate precautions.

Print Rooms need not be 'passive' spaces – though they are places for study (perhaps suggestive of quiet contemplation), they are also geared towards fostering creative engagement in diverse audiences. Several internationally renowned print rooms lead or contribute to a range of public educational programmes, including talks, tours, and study days for groups. In particular, university print rooms, including those of the Yale University Art Gallery, are regularly set aside for art-historical lectures.

== Often not in the expected museum ==
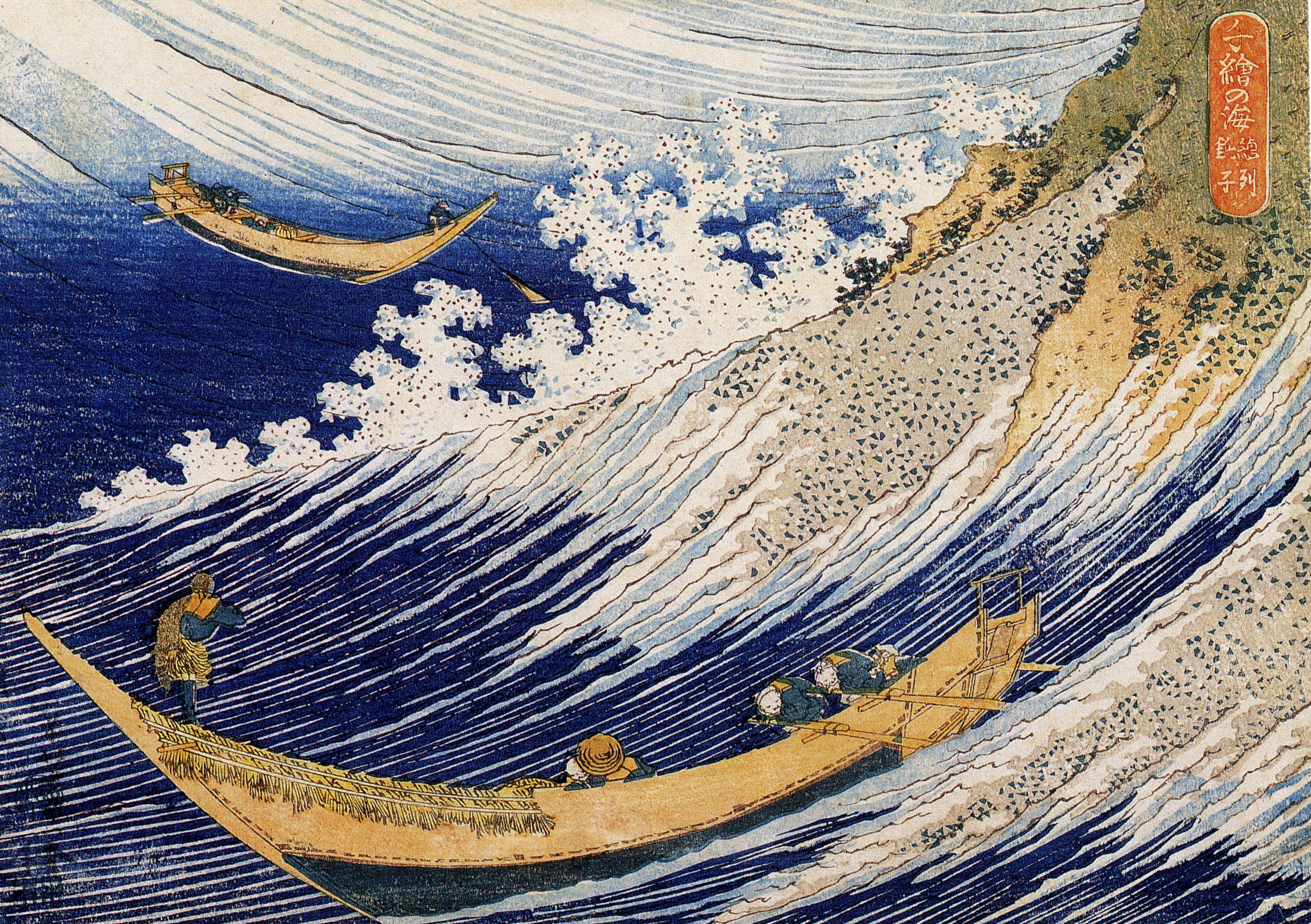
Ukiyo-e coloured woodcut by Hokusai

Because of the historical development of museums, and also funding, prints, and drawings are sometimes associated with library collections rather than collections of paintings. For example, in Paris, the main print (but not drawings) collection is in the Bibliotheque Nationale de France, not the Louvre. In New York and Washington, both the main art museums (Metropolitan Museum of Art and National Gallery of Art Washington) and the libraries (New York Public Library and Library of Congress) all have important, though very different, collections. Sometimes, material from non-Western traditions – in particular, Asian material, including Japanese prints – may or may not be held in the same department, or the same institution.

In the US public libraries are officially more accessible than art museum print rooms, which are often privately funded and only open to academic researchers. But most public libraries with prints and drawings collections tend to house these in discrete rooms, where they are tended to by specialist works on paper curators (see, for example, the Art and Architecture Room and Prints and Photographs Room of New York Public Library).

In the UK national collections of art on paper are, in the main, publicly funded and thus widely accessible in gallery and museum print rooms; they rarely form part of library holdings. The UK's main collection of Western prints and drawings is held in the British Museum and includes fine examples by the Old Masters. The National Gallery holds no works on paper; only paintings and sculptures of the European tradition. Originally known as the national gallery of British art, Tate Britain holds British prints and drawings, which include the world's largest collection of watercolours, sketches and engravings by JMW Turner, historic works on paper from the late 18th and 19th centuries, and modern and contemporary British and International prints. The Victoria and Albert Museum's works on the paper collection have a particularly broad remit, encompassing works of fine and applied art (including posters) as well as ephemera.

When the British Museum's main collection and library collection separated in 1997, evinced by the establishment of the British Library (on separate premises in St Pancras), art on paper remained within the British Museum's Department of Prints and Drawings, with, for example, the exception of the library's East India Company collection which largely comprises maps and topographical drawings, now held within the Asia, Pacific and Africa Department of the British Library. Because of a decision in the late 19th century, where the bulk of the collection of topographical prints was classed with maps and put under the British Museum Library rather than the Prints and Drawings Department, these are now also in the British Library. The decision reflected the traditional view going back to the Renaissance that fine art required the use of the imagination, and that mere illustration of real scenes (often in practice considerably rearranged by the artist) did not qualify.

When, conversely, the Victoria and Albert Museum united its art and library collections, with the establishment of the Word and Image division, the Prints and Drawings Study Rooms and the National Art Library remained discrete entities, each with their own specialist staff (with different areas of academic and professional training) and facilities and services catered to the public's and collections' needs.

One of the relatively few print rooms to exist as a separate institution (rather than as part of a larger museum or library), the Albertina (Vienna) is by general consent, the world's greatest collection of Western art on paper. The Berlin Kupferstichkabinett at Kulturforum is, similarly, a major museum with an exclusive focus on prints and drawings. Though housed in the same building as the main paintings collection, the Gemäldegalerie, Berlin, it has separate direction and administration. (The list of museums with major collections of European prints and drawings has some very incomplete figures on the holdings of major collections.)
