= Zelandia Illustrata =

Dutch document collection

The Zelandia Illustrata is the oldest collection of prints about the Dutch county Zeeland. The collection consists of four categories: maps and plans, topography, history and life, portraits and personal particulars.

The collection was founded by the Amsterdam lawyer Jacob Verheye van Citters (1753–1823) in the 18th century. In 1863 the collection was handed over to the Zeeland's Royal Society of Science (Koninklijk Zeeuwsch Genootschap der Wetenschappen). At the time the collection comprised 3,000 items of representation. Through acquisitions and gifts the collection nowadays consists of around 18,000 maps, prints, drawings, photographs, glass negatives, slides and postcards. This material provides a versatile image of Zeeland from the 16th century to the present.
