= Architectural illustrator =

Artist who creates imagery for architectural designs

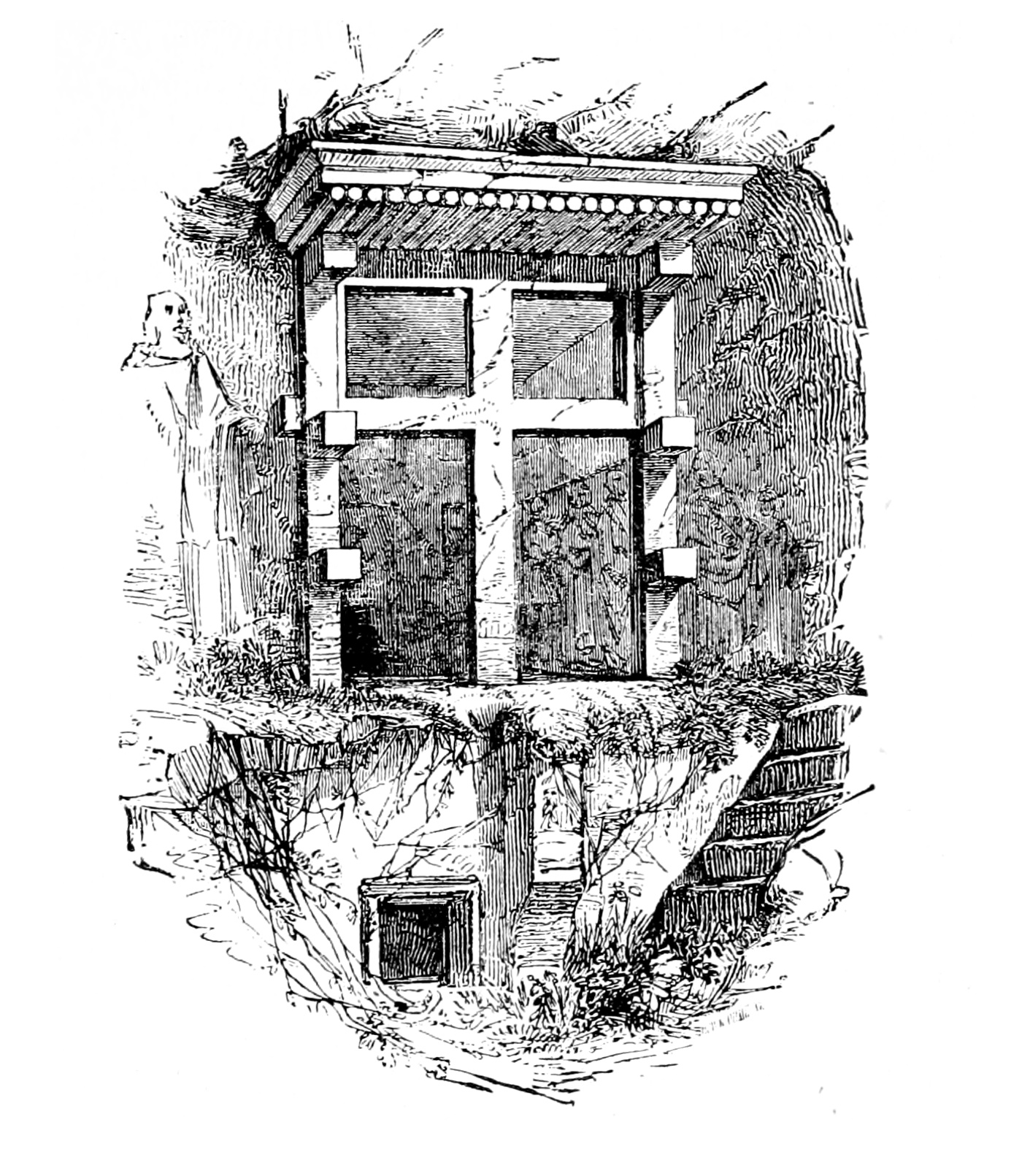
Illustrations from the book, A History of Architecture in All Countries, vol. I (1887), written and illustrated by James Fergusson.

An architectural illustrator is an artist who creates imagery for design professionals to portray the details of an architectural project. These images are used to communicate design ideas to clients, owners, committees, customers and the general public.

== About ==
Architectural illustrators are hired to put complex concepts or objects into graphical form. The artist uses artwork to turn small details into visual renderings. This field is based on the plan, design and construction of numerous structures. Illustrations created are typically two-dimensional and may include images or animations.

Technical draftsmanship and precise use of visual perspective are often prominent features in architectural illustration, although within these restrictions some artists such as William Walcot were known for a more fluid impressionistic style.

Architectural illustrators help put plans into a more digestible format for individuals without architectural expertise and generally work as an intermediary between an architect and the client. Architectural illustrations and models are often used during client presentations, fundraising events, sales pitches and meetings regarding permits.

== History ==
The use of pictures to convey the form of a structure visually, rather than only through written instructions or descriptions, was practiced as early as the 12th century. In the 12th century, many examples of architectural illustrations showed structures mentioned in the Bible.

More recently, architectural illustrator associations have been founded to publicize and support the use of architectural illustrators in communicating design ideas. Such associations have been founded as early as 1975.

== Software ==
Computer-based software, such as SketchUp, can be used by architectural illustrators to create architectural renderings. Such software can also be used to create a three-dimensional environment for clients to explore digitally.

== See also ==
- 3D computer graphics
- Architect
- Architectural model
- Architectural rendering
- Illustrator
- Watercolor

== Architectural illustrator associations ==
- American Society of Architectural Illustrators
- New York Society of Renderers
- Society of Architectural Illustration
