= Architectural animation =

Computer-generated animation of architectural designs

Architectural animation is a short architectural film or video created using computer-generated imagery. It usually shows a building or development before construction, often with landscaping, people, vehicles and surrounding environments. Unlike an architectural rendering, which is a single image from one point of view, an architectural animation is made from a sequence of still images or rendered frames played in order to create motion.

When these images are assembled and played back, they create a moving view of the proposed design. A computer-generated environment may be added around the building to show its relationship to the surrounding area. Architectural animations are often used alongside architectural renderings.

== History ==
The first use of a 3D hidden-line removal movie depicting an architectural street scene was in 1976 by Jonathan Ingram. It showed the planned Crown Courts in Hobart and was used for planning approval. The buildings exist today.

== Usage ==
Architectural animation is used to present building designs to clients, investors, planning authorities and the public. Demand for computer-generated architectural visualization has increased as rendering technology has become more accessible. Real-time rendering engines have also changed the production process by allowing images and animations to be generated more quickly than traditional frame-by-frame rendering.

Architectural animations can help viewers understand the scale, layout and spatial qualities of a project before construction begins. They are often produced by architectural visualization studios, animation studios or design offices.

== Process ==
The process of creating an architectural animation commonly begins with a storyboard or planned camera path. This helps define the scope of the project and estimate the time required. A three-dimensional model of the building or environment is then created, and textures, materials, lighting and other details are added.

Still frames are often presented to the client during production so that the design, materials and colors can be reviewed. After approval, the final sequence of frames is rendered, edited and presented as a video, sometimes with sound or music.

== Production considerations ==
Architectural animation usually requires more time and computing resources than a single still rendering because many frames must be produced. It may also require a larger team, including modelers, texture artists, lighting artists, animators and editors. Improvements in rendering software and computer hardware have made architectural animation more common in architectural and real estate marketing.

== See also ==
- Computer animation
- 3D computer graphics
- Architectural rendering
