= The Metropolis of Tomorrow =

Book written and illustrated by Hugh Ferriss

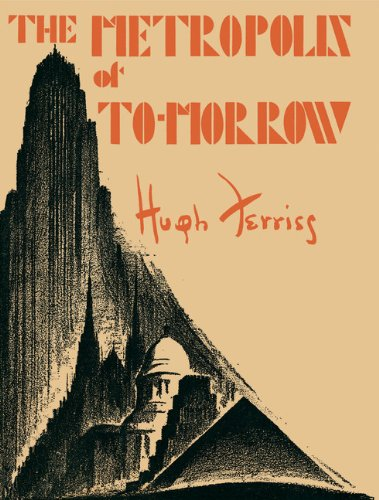
- Modern cover
- Author: Hugh Ferriss
- Illustrator: Hugh Ferriss
- Language: English
- Subject: Architecture; Futurology
- Publisher: Ives Washburn
- Publication date: 1929
- Publication place: United States
- Media type: Print
- ISBN: 9780910413114 (1986 edition)

The Metropolis of Tomorrow is a 1929 book written and illustrated by Hugh Ferriss. Prominently featuring 60 of Ferriss' drawings, the book is divided into three sections. The first, "Cities of Today", underscores the lack of planning in contemporary cities and the powerful psychological impact that cities have on their inhabitants while also profiling 18 influential modern buildings in five cities. The second section, "Projected Trends", prominently discusses practical concerns related to population density and traffic congestion, demonstrates Ferriss' adherence to some of the key elements of modern architecture (especially functionalism), and then analyzes projected trends in urban design that he supports, as well as a few that he opposes. The third and final section, "An Imaginary Metropolis", describes an ideal future city complete with towering skyscrapers spaced well apart from each other, broad avenues, and a strongly geometric city layout based around centers and sub-centers of buildings that are segregated by function.

First published by Ives Washburn in 1929, The Metropolis of Tomorrow was out of print long before the Princeton Architectural Press republished it in 1986. Contemporary critical reception to the book was mostly positive and enthusiastic, and generally regarded Ferriss' ideas for the future city as credible and even practical. While in the minority, negative contemporary reviews of the book significantly came mostly from proponents of the regional planning movement. Writing with the benefit of hindsight in 1986, architectural historian Carol Willis noted the strong connections between the first and second sections of the book ("Cities of Today" and "Projected Trends"), but criticized the final section ("An Imaginary Metropolis") as a flight of fantasy, both impracticable and lacking in nuance. Similarly, more recent reviewers have concentrated on "An Imaginary Metropolis", which they generally view as a fantasy which has had a strong influence on later architects and urban planners, and has also been influential to the appearance of futuristic cities in comic books and films.

== Synopsis ==
=== "Cities of Today" ===
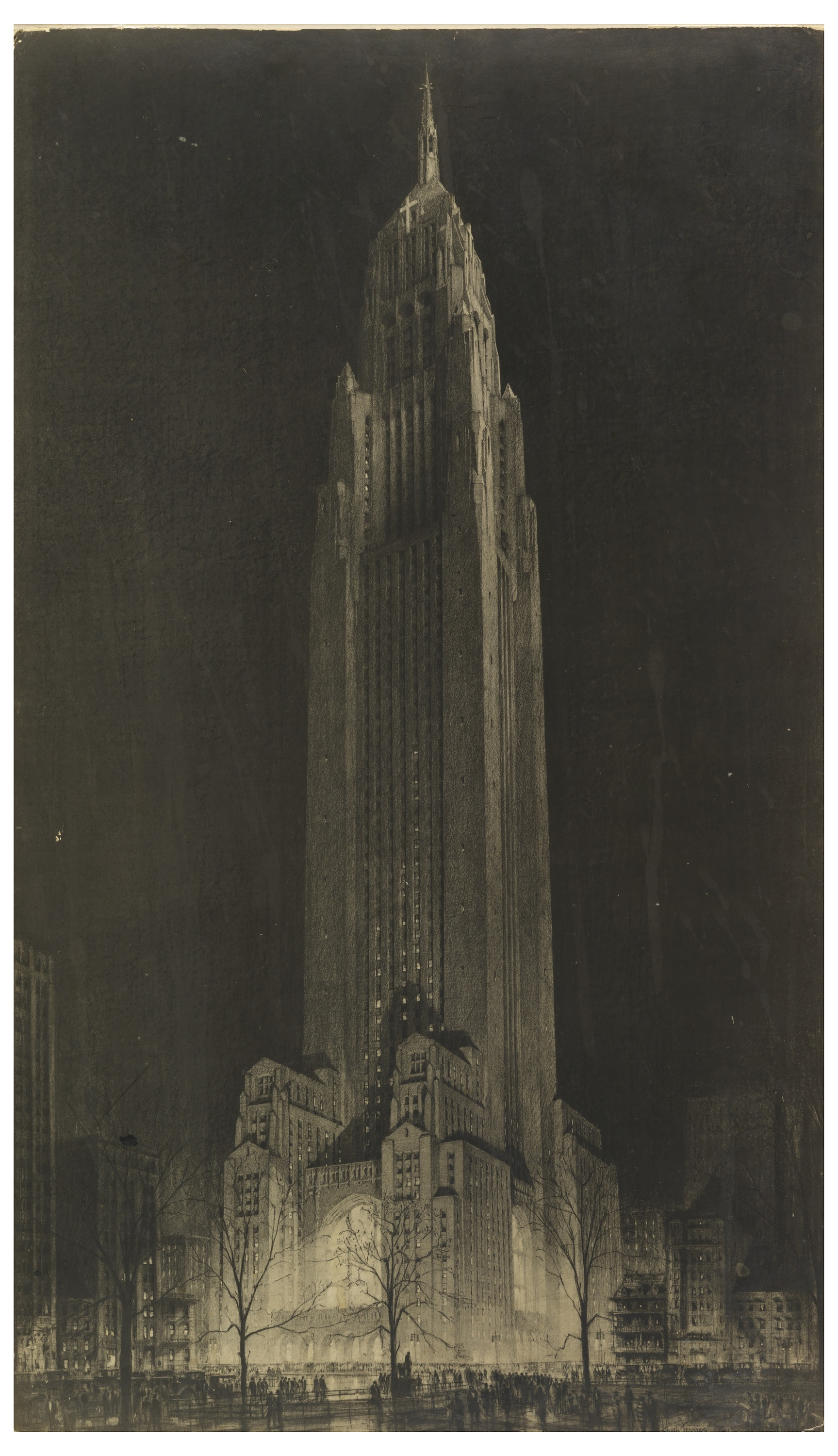
Hugh Ferriss' drawing of the unbuilt Convocation Tower

The Metropolis of Tomorrow is divided into three sections which in total prominently feature 60 of Hugh Ferriss' drawings. The first section, "Cities of Today", begins with a vignette describing the contemporary New York City skyline of the late 1920s in theatrical terms, largely focusing on the enormous scale of modern skyscrapers and the impressions they make on city dwellers. According to architectural historian Carol Willis, this section outlines the book's main themes, namely the lack of planning in contemporary cities, the powerful psychological impact that cities have on their inhabitants, and the responsibility of architects to preserve humanistic values as cities continue to grow. "Cities of Today" is mostly devoted to a brief building-by-building analysis of what Ferriss viewed as "some of the outstanding buildings of the country", which he considered especially influential and illustrative of future trends. In total, 18 projects by 15 different architectural firms in five cities are examined. The first two buildings profiled are both in St. Louis: the Telephone Building, noted for its use of setbacks; and the St. Louis Plaza, which Ferriss upheld as an example of collaborative architectural planning that did not compromise design. The next two buildings featured are in Chicago, the Chicago Board of Trade Building and the Chicago Tribune Building, the latter of which Ferriss considered unusually beautiful for an office building.

Following the St. Louis and Chicago projects, the next set of buildings profiled are all in New York City, and Ferriss featured many of them because of their innovative and sometimes controversial design and styling. These buildings include the Radiator Building, the Shelton Hotel, the unbuilt Belden Project, the Master Building, the Waldorf-Astoria Office Building, the lobby of the Daily News Building, and the unbuilt Convocation Tower. Following them are three buildings in Detroit that Ferriss described as "undoubtedly the forerunners of the future city": the Greater Penobscot Building, the Fisher Building, and the David Stott Building. Following this is a single building in Los Angeles, the Los Angeles Municipal Tower, which Ferriss noted was the only true skyscraper in the city at the time due to municipal building height limitations.

Ferriss concluded the "Cities of Today" section by returning to New York City and profiling three recent buildings that were built to unprecedented heights and which were, in Ferriss' opinion, the projects that most foreshadowed future developments in skyscrapers and urban construction more generally. To Willis, these were the buildings that "raised the issues of the race for height and of congestion." The three buildings are the Chanin Building, the Chrysler Building, and the Bank of the Manhattan Company Building.

=== "Projected Trends" ===
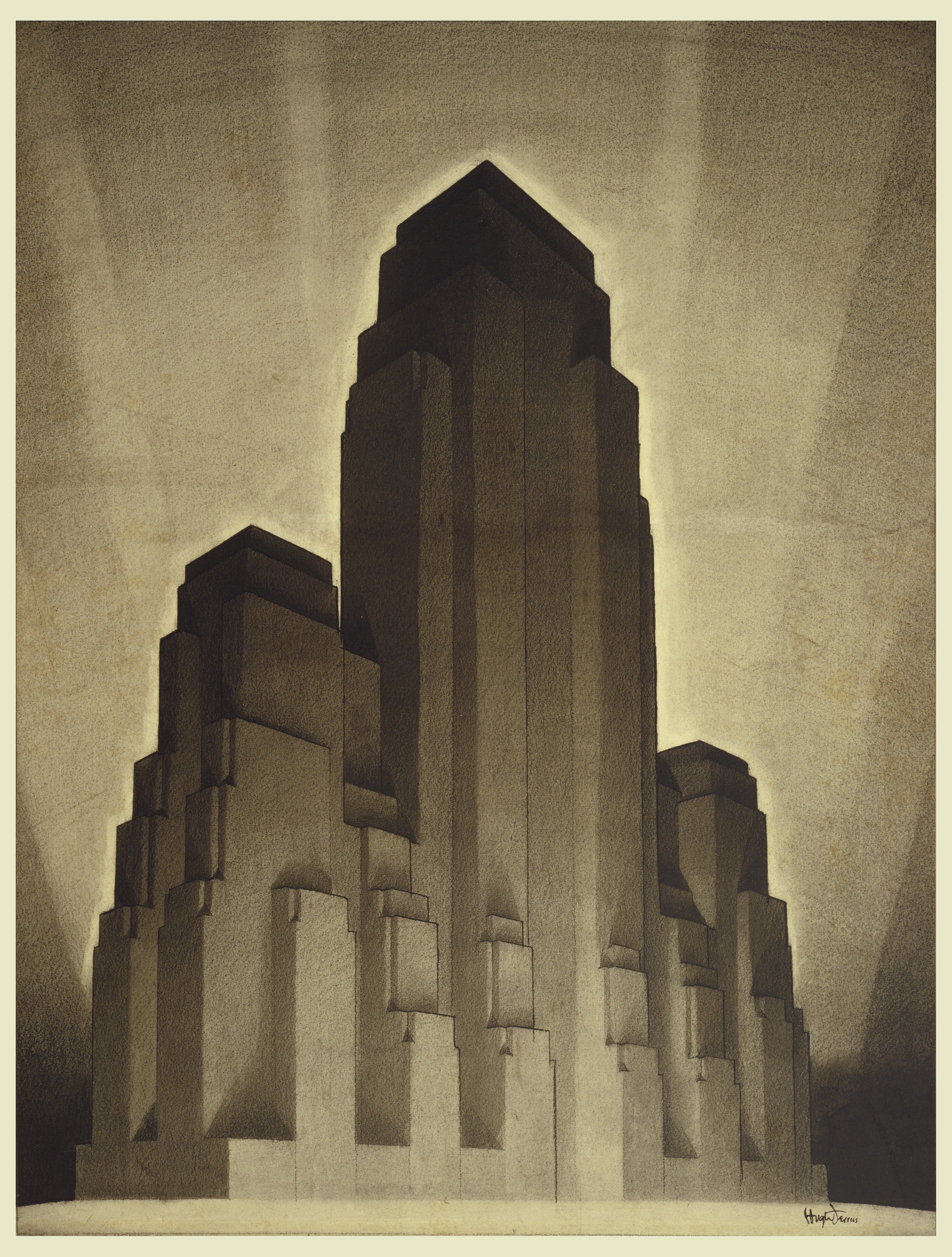
Ferriss' drawing on a study for the maximum mass permitted by the 1916 New York City zoning laws

The second section, "Projected Trends", begins with a brief vignette about the "lure of the city" to young people and prominently discusses practical concerns related to population density and traffic congestion. Almost all of the drawings in this section were published or exhibited prior to being included in The Metropolis of Tomorrow. In "Projected Trends", Ferriss reveals some of his ideas about the power of architecture to influence human thought and behavior, and he proceeds to espouse some of the key elements of modern architecture, especially functionalism. He also voices his objection to densely crowding numerous skyscrapers in close proximity to each other, as well as his opposition to building roads and bridges for automobiles above street level in city centers, both of which were somewhat popular ideas among futurists at the time. According to Willis, these drawings depicting densely packed skyscrapers and elevated automobile traffic have ironically "often been misread as endorsements, whereas Ferriss conceived them as admonitions."

From here, Ferriss turns his attention to projected trends that he supports: segregating pedestrians from cars by building a system of arcaded walks along buildings, with bridges across intersections one story over street level; building skyscraper churches with either apartments or offices accommodating most of the floors, with the sanctuary either at the base or the top of the building; and suspension bridges with apartments built into the side of the bridge deck as well as the bridge towers. Willis stresses the serious nature of these proposals, observing that "in the endless invention and boundless expansion of the 1920s, virtually no scheme seemed impossible." Ferriss proceeds to describe and diagram the evolution of the setback principle for skyscraper design, in which he likens the architect's work to a sculptor working with clay, and argues that New York City's zoning laws are actually a blessing in disguise to architects as they all but mandated the adoption of the setback principle.

Ferriss continues with a more practical discussion of the advantages of building skyscrapers on wide avenues and spreading them out from other tall buildings, as well as the possibility of constructing buildings spanning two blocks or more with streets passing beneath them in scenic tunnels. He then briefly criticizes architects who wish to revert to "past styles" with base-shaft-crown construction instead of adhering to his setback principle before then predicting the increasing popularity of penthouse apartments, rooftop gardens, and the development of "modern ziggurats" hosting restaurants and theaters, which he viewed as a natural outgrowth of New York City's zoning laws and setback design. Ferriss then concludes the section by noting and extolling the virtues of the three most important building materials for future buildings: steel, concrete, and (especially) glass.

=== "An Imaginary Metropolis" ===
The third section, "An Imaginary Metropolis", begins with a theatrical vignette similar to that of the opening section, but this time the curtain rises on "a city of the imagination". It features tall buildings, many of them 1,000 feet (300 m) in height or taller. Instead of being densely packed, however, they are spread apart from each other and are segregated by function. The tall buildings take up three to eight city blocks for their bases, and they are separated from each other by 0.5 miles (0.80 km) of low-rise buildings no taller than six stories in height and connected by broad avenues. Ferriss visualizes this ideal city as having three main zones: a Business Center, the largest of the three centers, and also home to municipal government buildings; an Art Center; and a Science Center, which features laboratories. He then outlines the sub-centers of the city, also conceptualized functionally: a Finance Center, a Technology Center, an Industrial Arts Center, and a Philosophy Center. These sub-centers are located logically in relation to the centers, so for instance, the Philosophy Center is located between the Art Center and the Science Center.

Ferriss also sketches plans for a coal-fired power plant, as well as a single skyscraper church shared by all of the city's religious denominations. He visualizes the transportation infrastructure of the city as consisting of underground subways and car parking, with ground-level streets for cars. Ferriss concludes the section by providing a bird's eye view of this ideal city, which is centered around a triangular Civic Circle with each of the three main zones (Business Center, Art Center, and Science Center) at its corners, with radial avenues fanning out from them to the sub-centers and ultimately on to the outlying districts of the city. Willis compares this conception to a Renaissance treatise, noting its "strong geometric plan which was primarily formal and symbolic, rather than functional". Ferriss concludes the book with a brief epilogue that focuses on his belief about how much architecture influences people.

== Publication ==
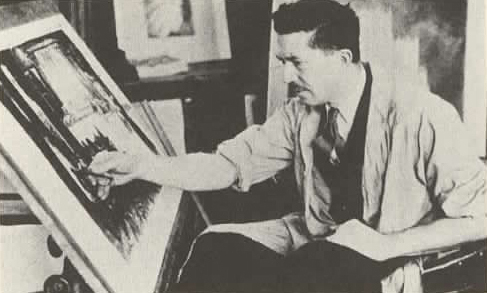
Ferriss at work in 1925

Ferriss received an advance royalty of $1,000 from the book's publisher, Ives Washburn, in 1929. The book was published in late 1929, after the Wall Street crash. Of the 60 illustrations featured in the book, only 13 of them were created specifically for The Metropolis of Tomorrow, and all of these 13 appear in the final section "An Imaginary Metropolis".

Writing in 1986, architectural historian Carol Willis noted that the book had been "long out of print". In 1986, Princeton Architectural Press republished The Metropolis of Tomorrow (along with an essay by Willis) as a companion to the exhibition Hugh Ferriss: Metropolis, which was sponsored by the Architectural League of New York and partially supported by a grant from the National Endowment for the Arts. The exhibit opened at the Whitney Museum in New York City and then traveled to the Walker Art Center in Minneapolis, the Art Institute of Chicago, the National Building Museum in Washington, D.C., the Centre de Création Industrielle at the Centre Georges Pompidou in Paris, and the Architectural Association in London.

== Critical reception ==
Contemporary reception to The Metropolis of Tomorrow was mostly positive and enthusiastic, and generally regarded Ferriss' ideas for the future city as credible and even practical. Albert Guerard of Herald Tribune Books called the book "wise and generous in vision, cogent in thought, clear and strong in literary style, appealing as a work of art, magically stirring as a prophecy". Joseph G. Niehardt of the St. Louis Post-Dispatch went as far as to declare that he had "yet to see a book in which the depth of genuine poetic feeling, philosophic grasp and scientific practicality were mysteriously merged." New York Times Book Review critic R. L. Duffus expressed some reservations over the scale and density of Ferriss' vision, but nonetheless assumed the inevitability of further centralization and thus his ordering of the future city: "Monster cities and buildings are already here. They are being built by forces not yet under our control. The task is to subdue them ... [and] Mr. Ferriss has contributed something to the fulfillment of that goal."

Negative contemporary reviews of The Metropolis of Tomorrow came mostly from proponents of the regional planning movement. In this vein, Geddes Smith wrote that the book "is certainly beautiful and is probably vicious ... because to glorify the American skyscraper is to confirm the thoughtlessness in a perilous fallacy." Even more representative of the regional planning movement was the criticism of Regional Plan Association of America member Lewis Mumford, who warned that under Ferriss' proposal "innumerable human lives will doubtless be sacrificed to Traffic, Commerce, Properly Regulated and Zoned Heights on a scale that will make Moloch seem an agent of charity." Mumford further objected to skyscrapers as "pyramids of ground rents", and warned of the seductive nature of Ferriss' vision to professional urban planners as well as the general public, arguing that "this vulgar dream" was so powerful that "even the decent and otherwise enlightened technicians of the New York Committee on the Regional Plan have fallen under it."

Writing in 1986, Carol Willis notes that Ferriss' "future city seems decidedly a fantasy, exaggerated in its scale and hierarchical order, and certainly impracticable." She further writes that with the benefit of "today's historical distance, the impressive scale and harmonious ensembles of Ferriss' colossal towers and the formal hierarchy of his ideal city seem obviously impracticable and politically naive". Furthermore, she observes that Ferriss' "ideal metropolis radically contradicts most current opinion on the best qualities of a liveable city", most notably "an emphasis on pedestrian scale, public spaces, historic preservation and a heterogeneous urban fabric". More concretely, Willis notes that while Ferriss detailed some features of the city in great detail, "many other aspects of urban life were completely ignored", including schools, hospitals, police stations, post offices, stadiums, movie theaters, factories, and residences. She observes that while the first two sections of the book "linked current conditions and future projects", the third and final section "presented not an extrapolation or evolution of the contemporary city, but a utopia created ex novo".

In 2016, while writing for CityLab, Carl Abbott described the "unrestrained imagination" of Ferriss that "created a city of the future in which step-pyramid towers rise from vaguely glimpsed streets". In his observation, Ferriss drew "fantastic views" filled with "hypertrophied Chrysler Buildings and superscaled Rockefeller Centers". In 2017, Ramona Albert, founder and principal of Ramona Albert Architecture, wrote that in The Metropolis of Tomorrow, Ferriss "offers an eerily accurate depiction of what cities could look like in the future, even though it was written almost a century ago." According to Justin Davidson, writing in 2017 for New York magazine, Ferriss "understood the romance embedded in the new zoning code" and, in his writing, was able to transform the zoning code into a "spectacularly utopian tool". Furthermore, he argued that The Metropolis of Tomorrow "shaped the dreams of architects, planners, comic-book illustrators, and Hollywood set designers."

Writing for Quartz in 2018, Darren Garrett argued that the third section of The Metropolis of Tomorrow echoed Ebenezer Howard's Garden Cities of To-morrow while also illustrating Ferriss' "plans for an entire city that showcases not only his draughtsmanship, but his forward-looking ideas on urban planning". He further observed that Ferriss' drawings went beyond simple architectural renderings, as "his dramatic sense of light and shadow depict cities strangely devoid of people, or solo figures dwarfed by their majestic surroundings." Also in 2018, Andrew Berman of the Greenwich Village Society for Historic Preservation wrote that The Metropolis of Tomorrow "influenced a generation of architects who created some of the most striking and memorable buildings of the era, including the Empire State and Chrysler Buildings."

== Sources ==
- Ferriss, Hugh (1929). The Metropolis of Tomorrow. Ives Washburn.
- Willis, Carol (1986). "Drawing Towards Metropolis". The Metropolis of Tomorrow. Princeton Architectural Press. ISBN 0-910413-11-8.
