= Harvey Wiley Corbett =

American architect

- Born: January 8, 1873; San Francisco, California, U.S.
- Died: April 21, 1954 (aged 81)
- Occupation: Architect
- Awards: New York Chapter of the American Institute of Architects achievement award, 1954
- Buildings: Bush Tower; Bush House; Metropolitan Life North Building
- Projects: Peace Arch; George Washington Masonic National Memorial

Harvey Wiley Corbett (January 8, 1873 – April 21, 1954) was an American architect primarily known for skyscraper and office building designs in New York and London, and his advocacy of tall buildings and modernism in architecture.

== Early life and education ==
Corbett was a San Francisco native. He was an 1895 graduate of the engineering program at the University of California, Berkeley and then was educated at the Ecole des Beaux Arts in Paris, where he was registered as a student on August 18, 1896, by teacher Godefroy-Freynet.

== Career ==
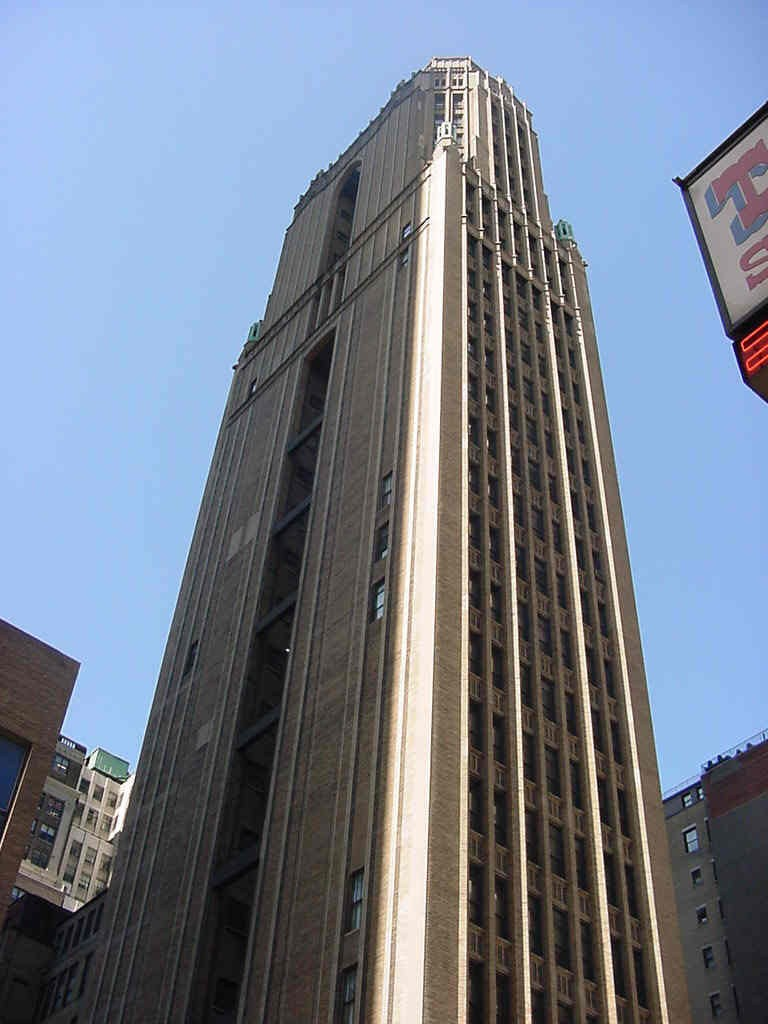
Bush Tower on 42nd Street near Times Square pictured in 2002

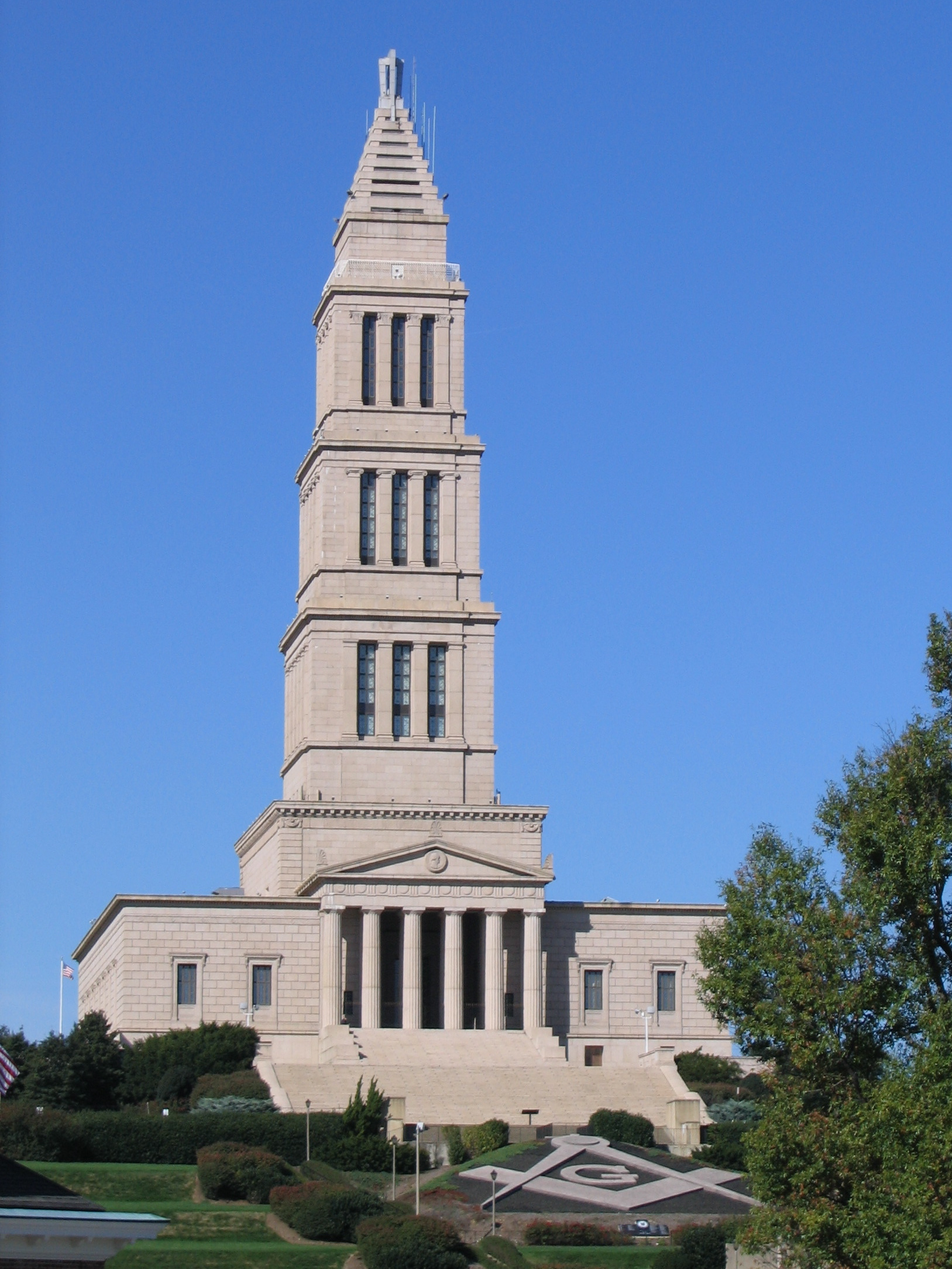
George Washington Masonic National Memorial in Alexandria, Virginia

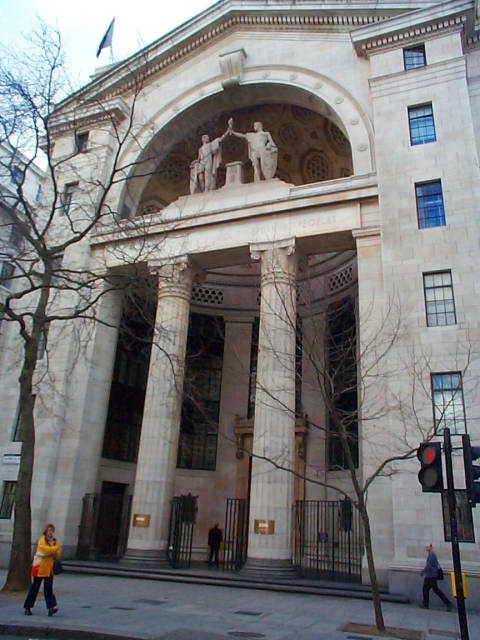
Bush House in London

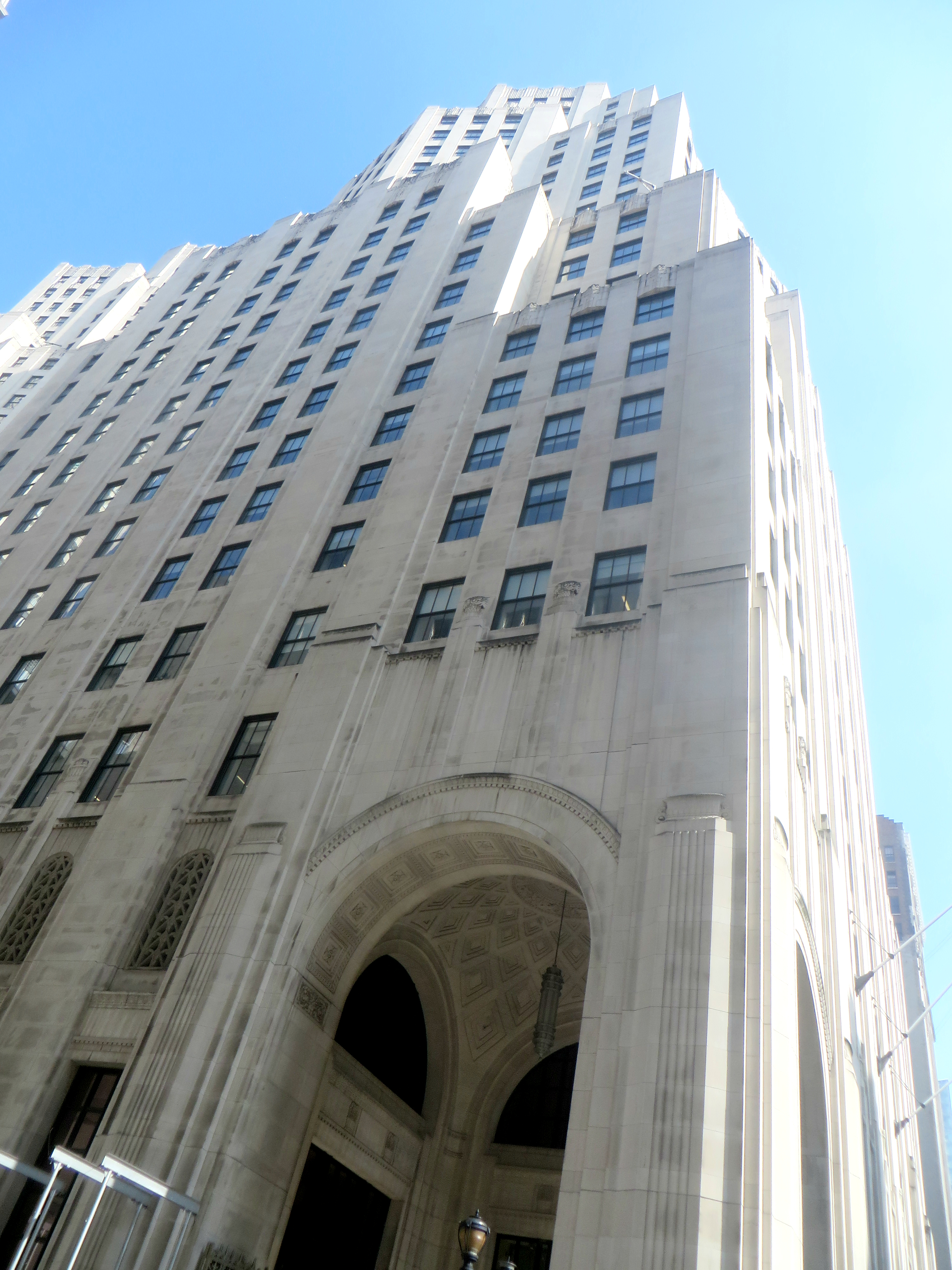
Metropolitan Life North Building as seen in 2017 designed by Corbett and partner D. Everett Waid (started 1928, Art Deco)

Following his graduation in 1900, he started work in the firm of Cass Gilbert. One of Corbett's early commissions during the 1910s was for the landmark Springfield Municipal Group, two large municipal buildings with a tower in Springfield, Massachusetts, in partnership with Francis L. Pell, a name partner in the architectural firm of Pell & Corbett.

As part of the firm of Helmle & Corbett, Harvey Wiley Corbett designed Bush Tower, a 30-story Neo-Gothic skyscraper built for the Bush Terminal Company on 42nd St. near Times Square in Manhattan. The tower, "with its prominent position and slight setbacks in buff, white and black brick, marked his début as an influential skyscraper designer."

Corbett's next major commission was in London, where he again worked for Irving T. Bush and the Bush Terminal Co. and was the architect for Bush House, a massive and essentially American-style office building built within the limits of strict London building codes.

Later in the 1920s, Corbett was part of one of the three firms that designed Rockefeller Center in Manhattan. Corbett left the Rockefeller Center project in 1928, and together with D. Everett Waid, worked on plans for the Metropolitan Life North Building, designed as a 100-story skyscraper and the world's tallest building, but eventually built as a 32-story tower during the Great Depression.

Corbett continued to design some structures during the Great Depression, including the massive New York City Criminal Courts Building in Manhattan, the northern tower of which is the Manhattan Detention Center, known as The Tombs. The complex was designed with Charles B. Meyers and completed in 1941.

In 1922, Corbett commissioned delineator and architect Hugh Ferriss to draw a series of four step-by-step perspectives demonstrating the architectural consequences of New York's City's zoning law, which he saw as a "setback." These four drawings would later be used in Ferriss's 1929 book The Metropolis of Tomorrow. By demonstrating how architecture might evolve, Corbett's commission and Ferriss's book continue to influence popular culture; the Gotham City of Batman and the cities seen in the 2004 movie Sky Captain and the World of Tomorrow were both influenced by Corbett and Ferriss.

In the late 1920s, the impact of skyscrapers on cities and downtowns was still hotly debated. Harvey Corbett defended the benefits of tall buildings against skyscraper detractors in articles published in The New York Times Magazine and National Municipal Journal in 1927.

In 1930, Corbett described modernism in architecture as a "freeing of the shackles of style that for years have forced architects to erect duplicates of Grecian temples for bank buildings, regardless of modern requirements for light, air, and utility."

Corbett lectured at the Columbia School of Architecture at Columbia University in New York City from 1907 to the 1930s. According to his obituary in The New York Times, Corbett was a longtime and ardent champion of skyscrapers and modernism.

== Legacy ==
In addition to his work on skyscrapers, office buildings, and municipal buildings, Corbett designed monuments, including the Peace Arch (1921) on the Canada–US border and the George Washington Masonic National Memorial in Alexandria, Virginia (cornerstone laid in 1923). Corbett shaped the course of architecture by heading the architectural committee of the 1933 World's Fair in Chicago. He was also chairman of the advisory committee of architects that created the theme for the modernistic 1939 New York World's Fair. Both fairs were influential examples of modern architecture.

Corbett was simultaneously a fellow of the American Institute of Architects and the Royal Institute of British Architects. One month before his death, the New York Chapter of the American Institute of Architects granted him their annual award for career achievement. In 1926, he was elected into the National Academy of Design as an Associate Academician, and became a full Academician in 1930.

Corbett's papers are contained within the collection of the Avery Architectural and Fine Arts Library at Columbia University.

== Selected works ==
- New York School of Applied Design for Women (1909)
- Bush Tower (1918)
- Peace Arch (1921)
- Navy – Merchant Marine Memorial (1922)
- George Washington Masonic National Memorial (1922–1932)
- Bush House, London (1923)
- One Fifth Avenue (1927)
- PPL Building (1928) at 28 stories, the tallest building in Allentown, Pennsylvania
- Metropolitan Life North Building (begun 1928, completed 1950; with D. Everett Waid)
- Master Apartments (1929)
- 185 Montague Street (1929–1930)
- New York City Criminal Courts Building, including The Tombs; with Charles B. Meyers (1941)
- Springfield Municipal Group in Springfield, Massachusetts
