= Bush Tower =

Office building in Manhattan, New York

- Bush Tower on November 2026
- Former names: Bush Terminal Building, Bush Terminal International Exhibit Building, Bush Terminal Sales Building

General information
- Type: Office
- Location: 130-132 West 42nd Street; Manhattan, New York, US
- Coordinates: 40°45′18″N 73°59′08″W
- Construction started: August 1916
- Completed: December 1918
- Opened: June 1918
- Renovated: 1921 (addition), 1938, 1983–1985, 2012–2016
- Cost: $30 million (2025)
- Owner: United Overseas Bank

Height
- Roof: 433 ft (132 m)

Technical details
- Structural system: Steel superstructure
- Material: Brick, terracotta
- Floor count: 30
- Lifts/elevators: 7
- Grounds: 14,947 square feet (1,388.6 m^{2})

Design and construction
- Architects: Frank J. Helmle and Harvey Wiley Corbett
- Developer: Irving T. Bush
- Main contractor: Thompson-Starrett Company

New York City Landmark
- Designated: October 18, 1988
- Reference no.: 1561

The Bush Tower (also the Bush Terminal Building, the Bush Terminal International Exhibit Building and formerly the Bush Terminal Sales Building) is a 433-foot-tall (132 m) building in the Midtown Manhattan neighborhood of New York City, just east of Times Square. Designed by Frank J. Helmle and Harvey Wiley Corbett of the firm Helmle & Corbett, the building occupies a plot at 130–132 West 42nd Street between Broadway and Sixth Avenue.

The Bush Tower was built for Irving T. Bush's Bush Terminal Company, which operated Bush Terminal in Sunset Park, Brooklyn, New York City. The 30-story section of the tower facing 42nd Street was developed between 1916 and 1918. A 10-story wing, completed in 1921, extends south to 41st Street. The Bush Tower's design combined narrowness, height, and Neo-Gothic architecture, and the massing contains several setbacks to comply with the 1916 Zoning Resolution. The facade contains trompe-l'œil brickwork, which creates vertical "ribs" with a false "shade" pattern to enhance the building's verticality. It originally contained a buyer's club on its three lowest stories and exhibits on its upper stories.

The Metropolitan Life Insurance Company foreclosed upon the tower in 1938 and the upper floors were subsequently converted for regular office usage. By the early 1980s, the Bush Tower had deteriorated significantly and the owners considered demolishing the building. It was instead renovated and was designated as a city landmark in 1988 by the New York City Landmarks Preservation Commission. As of 2015, China Vanke held a controlling ownership stake in the Bush Tower, while Tribeca Associates and Meadow Partners held a lease on the land. In 2026, United Overseas Bank took over ownership.

== Site ==
The Bush Tower is at 130–132 West 42nd Street, on the southern side of the street between Broadway and Sixth Avenue, in the Midtown Manhattan neighborhood of New York City, New York, U.S. The building extends 197.5 feet (60.2 m) southward to 41st Street, where it carries the alternate address of 135–137 West 41st Street. The building's land lot has a frontage of about 50 feet (15 m) along 42nd Street and 100 feet (30 m) on 41st Street, extending further west than the 42nd Street frontage. and covers 14,947 square feet (1,388.6 m^{2}). The site is near the Knickerbocker Hotel to the west, 1095 Avenue of the Americas to the east, 4 Times Square to the northwest, and Bank of America Tower to the northeast.

== Architecture ==
The Bush Tower was developed between 1916 and 1918 by Irving T. Bush's Bush Terminal Company, which sought to bring buyers, manufacturers, and designers to a common marketplace. The architects, Frank J. Helmle and Harvey Wiley Corbett of the firm Helmle & Corbett, (Note: The firm also designed Bush House in London and the George Washington Masonic National Memorial in Alexandria, Virginia.) gave the Bush Tower a neo-Gothic appearance that was somewhat similar to the nearly contemporary Woolworth Building. The main contractor was the Thompson-Starrett Company, while the terracotta contractor was the South Amboy Terra Cotta Company. Various firms were involved in furnishing the interior.

The building measures approximately 432 or 433 feet (132 or 132 m) from ground to roof. The tower is described as being 30 stories tall, or 29 stories if its double-height top story is counted as one floor.

=== Form ===
The Bush Tower was the city's first skyscraper to be constructed following the passage of the 1916 Zoning Resolution. Because the zoning ordinance greatly restricted the massing of buildings, it was characterized by contemporary writers as possibly the last skyscraper to ever be built in New York City. Instead, it came to impact the designs of other skyscrapers with setbacks (see Bush Tower § Impact). Even though several other architects at the time believed that the plans may have been adjusted in response to the 1916 Zoning Resolution, Corbett wrote that the inclusion of setbacks at the Bush Tower was part of the original design, which predated the resolution. The design for the massing was characterized by Fiske Kimball as being like an "arrow".

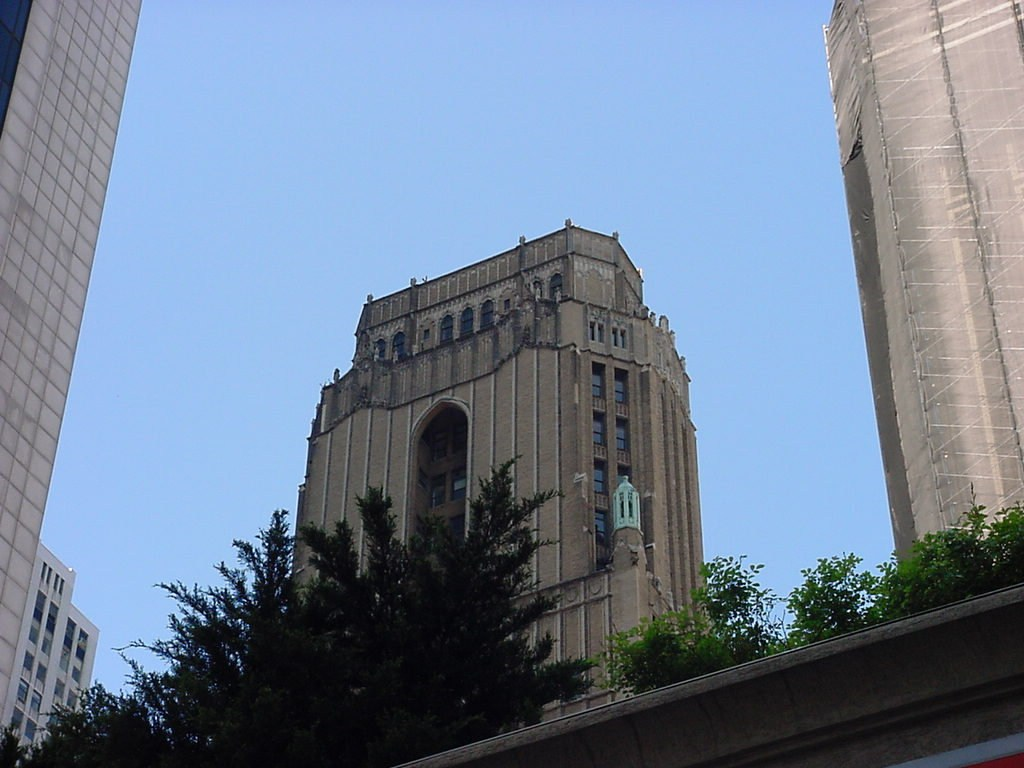
View of crown from 6th Avenue

The building's "shaft", which rises to the 22nd floor, measures only 50 feet (15 m) wide on 42nd Street and 90 feet (27 m) deep. At the center of the eastern facade is a recessed light court, which was designed to illuminate the offices at the center of the tower. A similar light court exists on the western side of the shaft. Because of the narrowness of the lot, the light courts take up significant space within the shaft. The 41st Street wing is ten stories tall and contains a light court on its eastern lot line, adjacent to the shaft. A penthouse is atop the roof of the 41st Street wing's 10th story.

For the top stories, Corbett wrote that he wanted "an appropriate finish [...] which would give the entire building the appearance of a soaring cathedral tower". Therefore, the top eight stories were designed as a six-story octagonal shaft set back from all sides, with a two-story roof pavilion. A water tower and elevator equipment is hidden behind the mansard roof above the pavilion. According to Corbett, the placement of mechanical equipment in the roof was a new idea for the time; he recalled a conversation with an unnamed client (likely Bush) who was surprised at the feature. The roof itself is clad with copper and was originally designed with finials on each end.

=== Facade ===
The architects stated that they wanted to make the Bush Tower "a model for the tall, narrow building in the center of a city block". During the design process, the lot's small frontage presented an issue of whether the building would be seen as an "infill" structure in the center of the block or as a distinct tower. The neo-Gothic design of the facade was a cheap solution to the design dilemma, being intended to emphasize the vertical lines of the facade. The Bush Tower's frontage and function as an office building precluded the need for conventional skyscraper fenestration, or window arrangement.

==== North and south facades ====
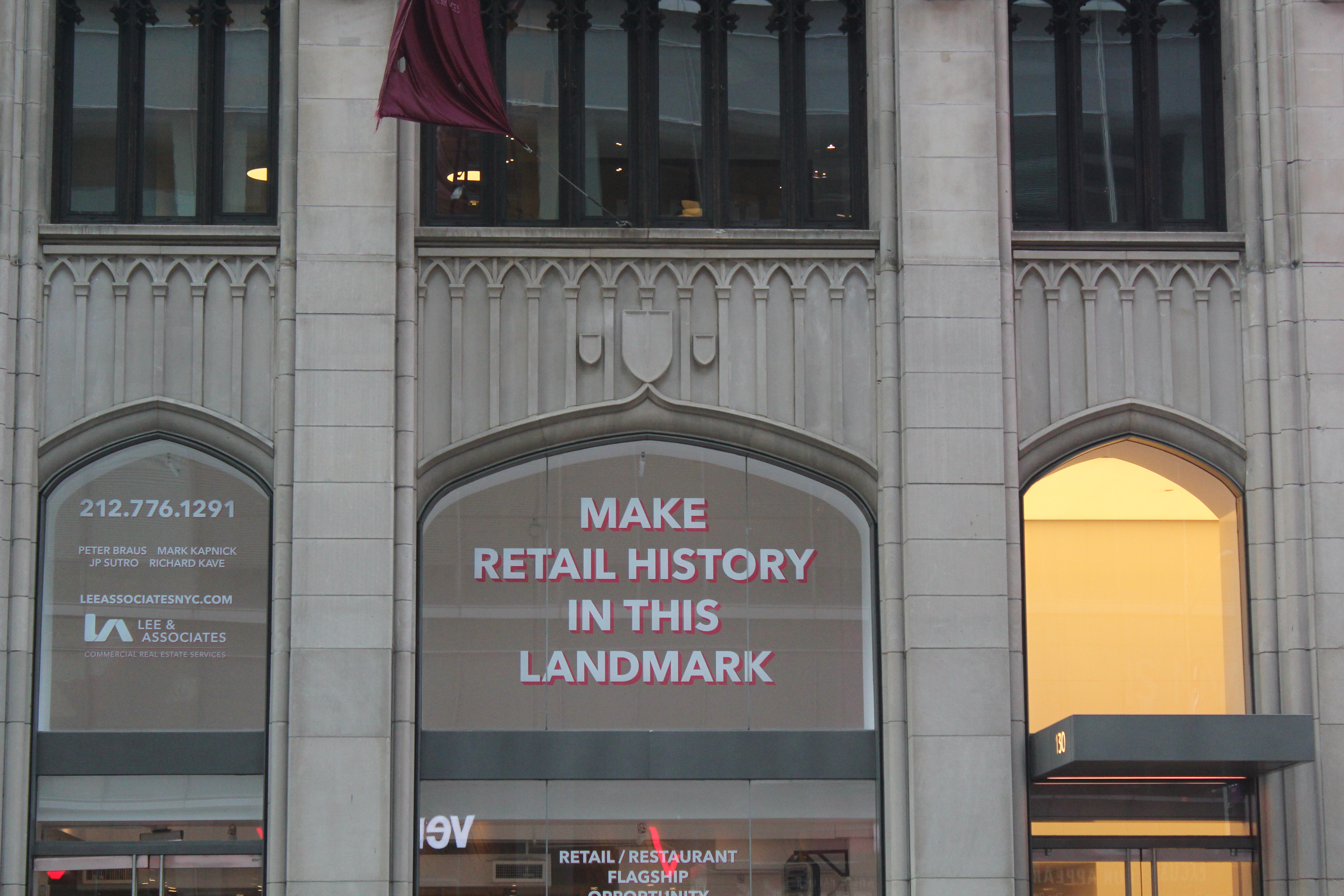
Restored street-level facade along 42nd Street

The primary elevations face north along 42nd Street and south along 41st Street. Entrances to the Buyer's Club on the lower floors, as well as the upper office floors, were placed on both streets. The base of the 42nd Street side originally contained three double-story, high-pointed-arched Gothic windows and a Gothic-style entrance. The current windows, removed in 1938 and reinstalled in 2015, are replicas of those in the original design. Following the 1938 modifications, the first and second stories at 42nd Street had rectangular window and door openings flanked by vertical limestone piers. A cornice runs above the third floor on 42nd Street; it is supported by corbels with nautical designs, which were manufactured by John Donnelly & Co., Inc. The spandrels above the fourth floor windows contain similar nautical designs.

The base at 41st Street is twice as wide and lacks corbels. It is divided into two 50-foot-wide sections; the western section was constructed as part of an annex in 1921, but the eastern section is part of the original tower. The western section resembles the original design, while the eastern section resembles the 1938 modification.

The remaining spandrels above each window are simple in design. Several primary and secondary vertical "ribs" are used to articulate both facades of the shaft between the first and 20th floors. The ribs divide the shaft into three vertical bays; the center bay on either side has three windows per story, while the side bays each have two windows. Above the 20th story is a horizontal band of panels, which wrap around to the eastern facade. Above the 22nd floor, there are copper lanterns at each corner of the shaft, as well as finials atop each of the facade's ribs. The top floor, within the roof pavilion, contains double-height pointed-arched windows with Gothic tracery. The top floor was illuminated at night in what Corbett described as "publicity of the most convincing sort".

==== Side facades ====
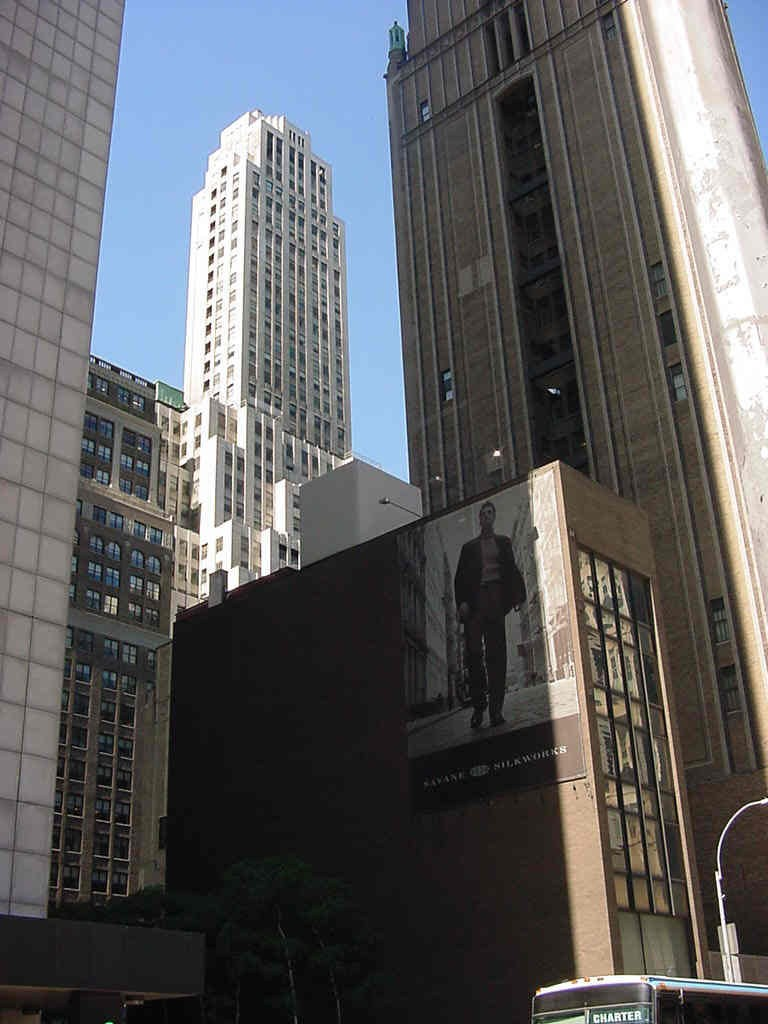
Light well on side; building from NewsRadio show visible in distance

With the exception of the light court, the east and west walls of the shaft are left largely blank, as Helmle & Corbett had assumed the adjacent lots would be developed in the future. This belief also prevented the inclusion of any cornices on the side facades, as they would overhang the lot line.

To give emphasis to the side walls, the architects used trompe-l'œil brickwork. Three tones of brick are used to provide aesthetic emphasis to the side walls, giving the impression that the piers wrapped around all sides of the building. The facades are mostly made of buff brick, but dark brick is used for shadows and light brick is used for highlights. Vertical "ribs" are installed on the side walls from the ground to the top story. This aesthetic effect was coordinated according to the shadows cast by the average angle of the sunlight. On the 41st Street wing, the eastern wall contains similar trompe-l'œil brickwork to the shaft, while the western wall is clad in buff brick.

=== Features ===
The Bush Tower contains over 200,000 square feet (19,000 m^{2}) of interior space. (Note: The Bush Tower is variously cited as containing either 210,000 square feet (20,000 m^{2}), 217,855 square feet (20,239.4 m^{2}), or 250,048 square feet (23,230.2 m^{2}) of interior space.) There are seven elevators in the building. When built, it contained four elevators, which were on the right (west) side of the 42nd Street entrance vestibule.

The Bush Terminal Company was intended as a central marketplace where merchants or their buyers could examine and select samples of goods without having to go to the warehouse. A promotional document by the company promised a wide variety of merchandise, including various clothes, furnishings, furniture, household appliances, machinery, groceries, toys, musical instruments, and travel and sporting goods. Displays and sales were held at the Bush Tower, but shipping and forwarding service occurred at the Bush Terminal (now Industry City) facility in Sunset Park, Brooklyn.

==== Structural features ====
The foundation of the structure extends 50 feet (15 m) deep to the underlying rock layer. These foundations carry a total load of 18,400 short tons (16,400 long tons; 16,700 t), distributed across 24 columns. The underlying ground conditions included irregular rocks and boulders within a layer of blue clay, as well as a stream about 30 feet (9.1 m) below ground.

The upper stories lacked interior partitions and therefore could not have any diagonal struts concealed in the walls. Instead, the superstructure columns contain strong braces where they intersect horizontal ceiling and floor beams. Because wide column spacing was necessitated on the lowest three floors, the fourth story was carried by two columns that carry 1,300 short tons (1,200 long tons; 1,200 t); these columns rested on two cross girders 72 inches (1,800 mm) deep. Generally, each story contains a ceiling height of 13.75 feet (4.19 m), but the ceilings on some stories are slightly higher. The superstructure is designed to withstand a wind pressure of 550 short tons (490 long tons; 500 t) on the exposed sides of the facade. The superstructure can carry a live load of 120 pounds per square foot (5.7 kPa), as well as a dead load of 85 pounds per square foot (4.1 kPa) on its I-beams and 100 pounds per square foot (4.8 kPa) on its columns.

==== First through third stories ====
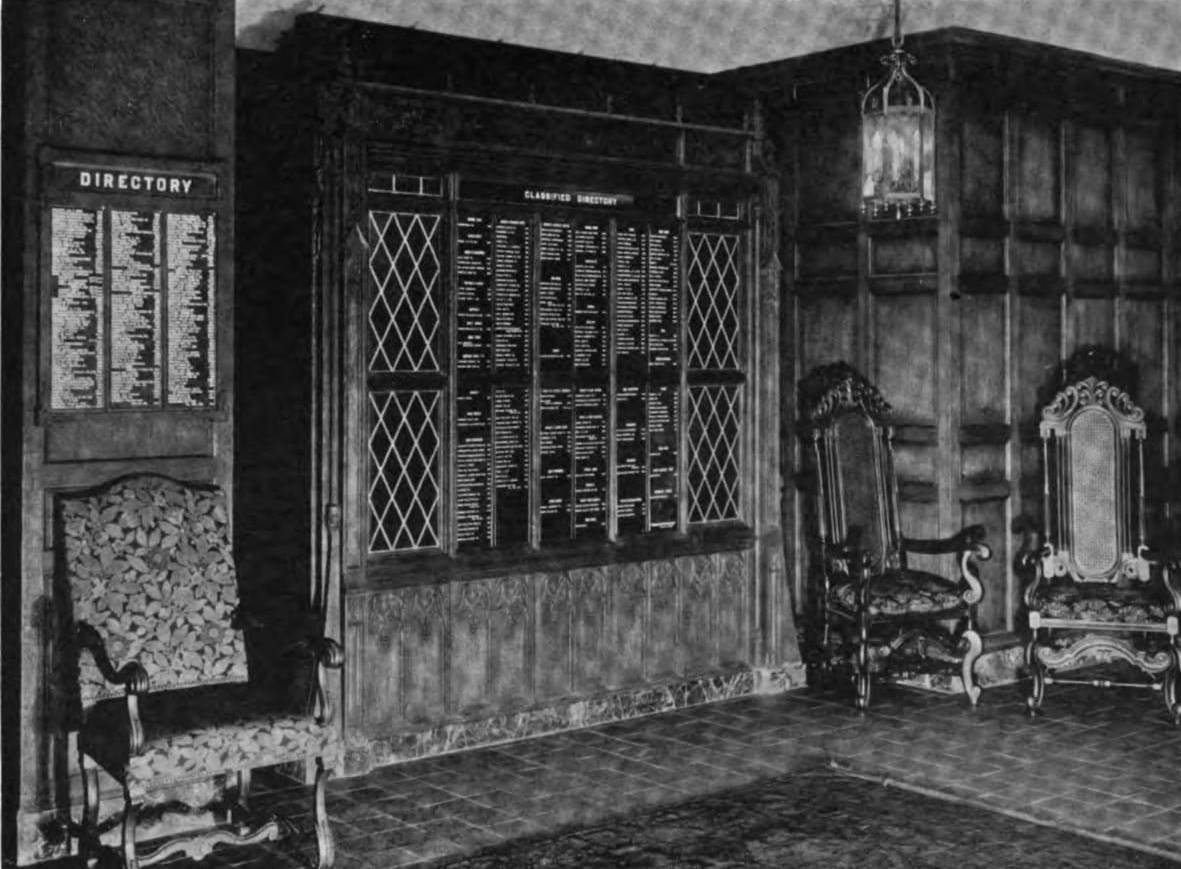
Directory board

The tower's lowest three floors were planned for the comfort and convenience of buyers visiting New York. These floors were modeled after a traditional large metropolitan private club and housed the International Buyers Club, which a brochure from the club described as containing "that mysterious element called 'atmosphere' and 'social standing'". Merchants and buyers from any accredited firm, domestic or foreign, could join for free. The floors were also designed to be "welcoming of women members"; at the time, salespersons were mostly men, but there were a growing number of saleswomen. It was intended as a refuge for buyers who wanted to take a break from the sales representatives on the upper stories, and solicitation was therefore prohibited on these floors. The club lasted only until about 1921, when it was converted into the Old Town Tavern, but the design remained in place over the following century.

The first story had an information bureau, magazine and cigar counter, ticket office, and lounges and "retiring rooms" for both ladies and gentlemen. The second story contained a lounge at the front, overlooking the first story, and a large reading room at the rear, staffed with trained librarians. The library contained media from "commercial topics" such as advertising, banking, industrial administration, labor disputes, retail selling, and scientific management. The third story had offices and conference rooms, as well as an auditorium that could host lectures, concerts, the viewing of manufacturers' own promotional motion pictures, or "fashion parades" for "displaying gowns". With the construction of the annex, an auditorium was added at the ground story.

Decorative features of the first through third stories included sculptural grotesques on some of the column capitals, including carvings of a manufacturer, bookbinder, and the ancient god of trade Mercury. The ceiling beams were intended to resemble "old oak timbers" with their close spacing. These lowest floors featured extensive oak paneling, oriental carpets, and antique furniture, similar to those in an old English manor house. According to the company's published promotional literature, this style gave one "the feeling of having entered a hundred-year-old tavern".

==== Upper stories ====
The upper 27 stories originally held displays of manufacturers' goods. The concept was explained as "the museum idea applied to commerce" by a writer for the Metropolitan Museum of Art's Bulletin. Each story was typically occupied by a single industry or by a collection of related products. The spaces, divided into units of 10 by 10 feet (3.0 by 3.0 m), were divided by low rails, glass partitions, or booths. The exhibits were overseen by trained salesmen hired by either the Bush Terminal Company or the manufacturer exhibiting the product. The displays were protected by fireproof construction, efficient ventilation, and ample lighting, according to a Bush Terminal Company promotional brochure. There was also a 400-seat auditorium on the ninth floor. These stories were converted into regular office suites after 1938.

== History ==
Irving T. Bush developed Bush Terminal in Brooklyn in the late 1890s. That complex grew into a 200-acre (81 ha) facility of large loft buildings, piers, warehouses, and railroad sidings. To assist business at Bush Terminal, Irving Bush devised the idea for the Exhibition Building and Buyers' Club (later the Bush Tower), a sales showroom and buyers club in Midtown Manhattan, in 1916. Although numerous showroom high-rises had previously been built in Manhattan, such as the Hampton Shops Building on 18 East 50th Street, none had as wide a scope as the planned Bush Terminal Exhibition Building.

=== Construction ===
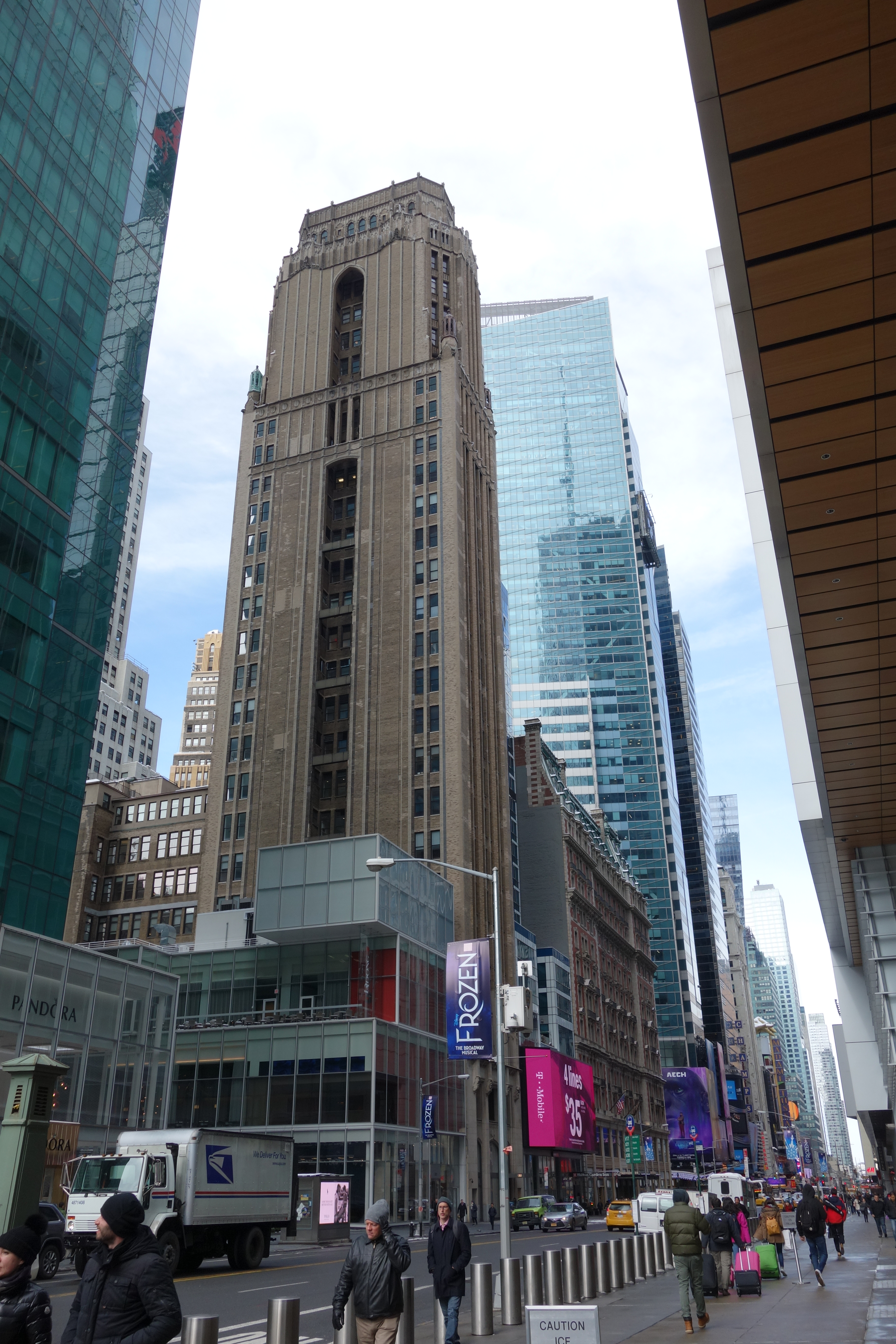
Seen from the base of the Bank of America Tower, looking west

During April 1916, the Bush Terminal Company signed a long-term lease for vacant property at 132–134 West 42nd Street. The plot extended the depth of the block, with 50 feet (15 m) of frontage on 42nd Street and 25 feet (7.6 m) on 41st Street. The Bush Terminal Company then announced plans for a 25-story showroom skyscraper on the site, to be designed by Helmle and Corbett. This site, near Times Square, was "one of the most central in the city" as described by the Real Estate Record and Guide. Furthermore, the proximity of Times Square's Theater District allowed tenants and visitors of the Exhibition Building and Buyers' Club to partake in leisurely activity. The plans were modified that June, bringing the building to 29 stories. (Note: The 29-story height counts the double-height top story as one floor.)

Thompson-Starrett were announced as the general contractor in July 1916. Work on the Bush Terminal Exhibition Building started the next month, when the existing buildings were razed. The 42nd Street "shaft" was to be constructed first, prior to the development of the 41st Street wings. All material for the project were brought through 42nd Street, a highly used thoroughfare. The brick, stonework, and terracotta were manufactured off-site before the foundation was completed; the materials were delivered at night to minimize traffic disruption. Furthermore, the buildings on either side were fully occupied and had to be shored up, as their foundations only extended to the soil, rather than to the rock.

The Bush Terminal Company bought the lease for the underlying land in January 1917. The first steel beam was placed that month and the first column footing was installed the following month. The steel framework was completed in four months and the exterior cladding was completed by October 1917. The building was essentially completed by June 1918 and several tenants had already moved into the structure. The Bush Tower was not officially completed until that December. The structure had cost $2 million to build (equivalent to $30 million in 2025).

=== Early use ===
Upon the structure's completion, Corbett moved his office to the building's top story. The Bush Tower experienced a large fire in December 1919, one year after its opening, but the fireproofing measures prevented the structure from burning down entirely. By then, the Bush Terminal Company was planning to replicate the Bush Tower's mixed commercial and social spaces internationally, starting with a branch in London. Bush succeeded in constructing Bush House on the Strand, London, during the 1920s. The concept there was not fully carried through.

In November 1919, the Bush Terminal Company acquired 137 and 139 West 41st Street for a future expansion. Bush rehired Helmle & Corbett to design a nine-story annex there, (Note: The New York Herald described the annex as being "from 20 to 29 stories".) as well as Thompson-Starrett to construct the annex. The annex was structurally completed by early 1921. The annex, which cost $400,000, was nearly identical in style to the original structure and had direct interior connections to the original building. Also in 1921, the company signed a long-term lease for the adjoining property at 136 West 42nd Street, with the intention of constructing a 20-story addition there. The Buyers' Club on the Bush Tower's lower floors was replaced by the Old Town Tavern that year. In addition, a 600-seat theater, known as the Cameo, opened on the 42nd Street side in December 1921.

A bank branch opened in the ground-story space in the early 1920s, which was replaced by the Old London Restaurant in 1931. A 14-foot-wide (4.3 m) pedestrian arcade at the center of the Bush Tower was also announced in 1927, running between the Cameo Theater to the west and the office shaft to the east. The arcade provided a connection between 41st and 42nd Streets and included small storefronts, a rear stairway to the basement, and an elevator to the second through fifth stories of the theater. The Cameo Theater, which was also operated by the Bush Terminal Company, later became known as the Bryant. The upper stories of the theater were taken by the Newspaper Club, which previously occupied some space in the 41st Street annex since 1922.

=== Mid- and late 20th century ===
After the Bush Terminal Company failed to pay mortgages of about $2.09 million, the Metropolitan Life Insurance Company bought the tower at a foreclosure auction in May 1938 for $1 million. Subsequently, the upper floors were converted for regular office usage. The storefronts on the lowest three stories were modified, and windows were installed on the eastern facade. An association of dress manufacturers moved into the tenth floor in 1939, and six commercial and office tenants took space in 1941. Herman's Stores, a sporting goods store, moved into the ground floor in early 1943, and the American Red Cross and two other tenants took space later that year. Some federal government agencies also took space in the Bush Tower during 1944.

The Bush Tower was purchased and auctioned off by real estate investor Jacob Freidus in 1945. It was subsequently bought by a syndicate co-headed by real estate developer Joseph Durst in 1951 at an assessed value of $2.03 million. The lease of the ground-level Bryant Theater was sold to Bernard Brandt in 1953. The Bush Tower was sold by the 130-8 W. 42d St Corporation to an unnamed client of Riker & Co. Inc. for $1.15 million in cash in January 1958. The Bush Tower later housed a Wurlitzer organ store, for which the building became well known, until the store closed in 1982. By the 1970s, the Times Square area had become rundown and the ground-level Bryant Theater was showing pornographic videos.

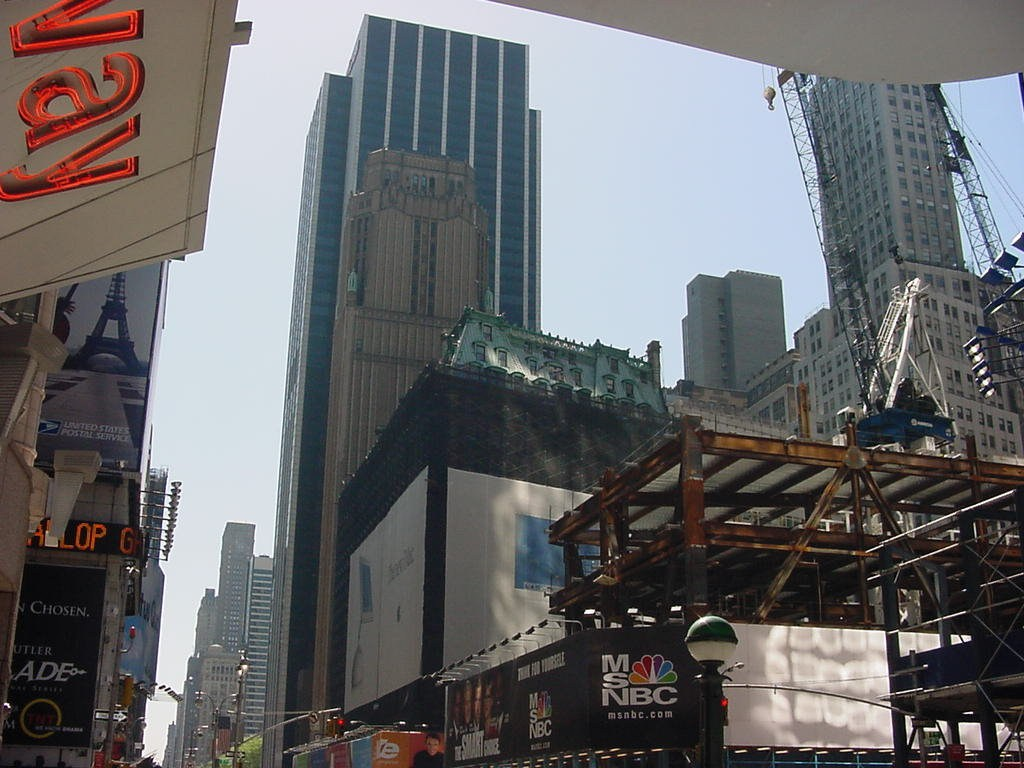
View from Times Square; 1095 Avenue of the Americas looms behind it

Lavoisier Properties, a Dutch Antillean company, purchased the Bush Tower in 1980 or 1981. American Properties, a company owned by the Dalloul family of Lebanon, was formed in 1983 to take over management of the building. The owners considered demolishing and replacing the Bush Tower, letting many tenants' leases expire. However, American Properties president Nicholas B. Ghattas recommended that the structure instead be overhauled, in anticipation that Times Square and West 42nd Street would rebound from its economic decline. The owners unsuccessfully tried to evict a porn shop at 136 West 42nd Street, which they believed to be driving down rental rates at the Bush Tower.

The Bush Tower was renovated from 1983 to 1985, with heating and electrical systems replaced throughout. The lobby was also widened, the elevators were replaced, the facade was cleaned and repaired, and new windows and restrooms were installed. The pornographic films being shown in the building's theater were also cleared out. At this time, the Bush Terminal Building was rebranded as "Bush Tower" to avoid confusion with the industrial facility in Sunset Park. The New York City Landmarks Preservation Commission (LPC) held hearings in 1986 during which it considered the Bush Tower for city landmark status. Two years later, on October 18, 1988, the LPC designated the Bush Tower as a landmark. The impasse over the neighboring porn shop continued for over a decade; by the late 1990s, Ghattas expressed concern that the shop's presence was hindering redevelopment of the surrounding section of 42nd Street.

=== 21st century ===
In 1999, Lavoisier purchased the neighboring porn shop and announced plans to raze the shop and combine it with the Bush Tower's land lot. In 2002, the owners publicized their plans for 140 West 42nd Street, a 23-story glass tower to be built on that lot. The new building, designed by Gruzen Samton, was to be separated from the Bush Tower by a 6-inch (15 cm) gap, necessitated by structural codes. Each floor of the new 143,000-square-foot (13,300 m^{2}) building was planned at the same level as the corresponding floor of the Bush Tower, allowing tenants of the latter to expand their space if needed. Dubai-based developer Istithmar World, owners of the Knickerbocker Hotel, purchased 136–140 West 42nd Street in 2006.

The Dalloul family offered the Bush Tower for sale in 2006, but withdrew the offer when it failed to raise the $165 million sought. When the family listed the tower for sale again in 2011, they sought $240 million. The 2011 sale offering also failed to draw any bids. In 2013, Tribeca Associates and Meadow Partners purchased a leasehold for the land underneath the tower for $65 million from the Dalloul family's American Properties. At the time, the southern side of 42nd Street had been redeveloped, and 80 percent of the building was leased. Subsequently, Tribeca Associates and Meadow Partners announced a $25 million renovation by Fogarty Finger Architects which would restore the ground-level arches on 42nd Street and add a double-height lobby. China Vanke bought a controlling ownership stake in the tower itself in 2015 for $125 million; by then, the building was 40 percent leased. In addition, the masonry and copper lanterns were repaired between 2012 and 2016.

The rear facade on 41st Street was not significantly upgraded, serving as the entrance for coworking space operated by WeWork. The company had signed a lease for 64,000 square feet (5,900 m^{2}) on the fifth through eighth floors, about a quarter of the building, in 2017. Shortly afterward, Fogarty Finger presented plans to the LPC to renovate the storefronts on 41st Street. United Overseas Bank placed a $120 million mortgage loan on the building the next year. In 2020, Club Nebula signed a lease for the ground-level space, replacing a pizza shop. The nightclub opened in November 2021 with space on the ground and mezzanine levels along 41st Street. Media company Future plc also leased space at the building that year. China Vanke gave up ownership of the Bush Tower to United Overseas Bank in June 2026; United Overseas intended to sell the building.

== Impact ==
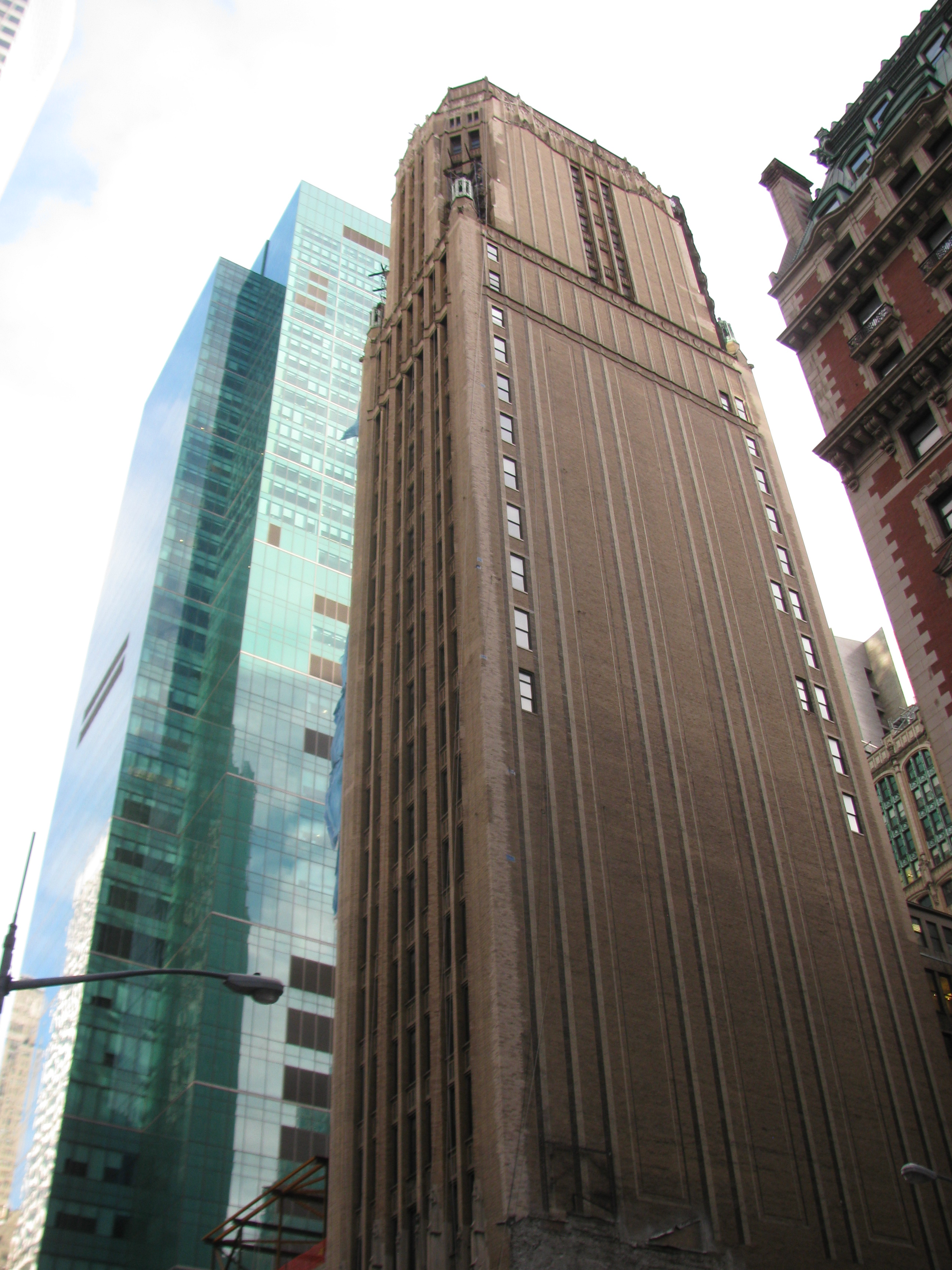
Viewed from east; 1095 Avenue of the Americas is in the background

The tallest building in Midtown Manhattan when completed, the Bush Tower signified the movement of the Manhattan business district to Midtown. The Bush Terminal Company, in a promotional material published shortly after the building's completion, described it as "the most imposing structure in the neighborhood [...] design, construction and finish immediately stamp it". Upon the Bush Tower's completion, The New York Herald called it a "world's fair in a skyscraper", and Literary Digest magazine dubbed it "a watch-tower of industry". The sentiment was repeated by David W. Dunlap for The New York Times, who described the building in 2015 as an attempt to create a trade center in Times Square, "long before the World Trade Center rose downtown". Furthermore, in 1918, Architecture and Building magazine characterized the tower as a symbol of recovery after World War I:

Begun before America's part in the great war and the consequences of it were fully grasped, it is only the beginning of that effort which must be made by our manufacturers to absorb our greatly increased production and to secure and hold our share of the world's markets. Efficiency and economy must be developed to a very high degree to accomplish this end, and the Bush Sales Building epitomizes that idea.

The Bush Tower, completed at a time when the effects of the 1916 Zoning Resolution were still unknown, was characterized in several architectural publications. Vanity Fair magazine wrote in 1917 that the Bush Tower's "simple, graceful and satisfying" design "marks a further step in the artistic development of the tall building." C. Matlack Price believed the silhouette of the Bush Tower to be one of the best among all New York City skyscrapers, while Orrick Johns called it an "exquisite, virginal creation" in The New York Times Magazine. The tower's design was also praised for its aesthetics. H. S. Gillespie, writing for Architecture magazine in 1919, said the tower was "one of the finest in New York", while Architecture and Building the same year stated that the building was a "new candidate" for the awe of the "present-day New Yorker". While Sheldon Cheney wrote in 1930 that the "one-fifth Gothic ornament" was "unoriginal", he considered the other four-fifths as "honesty and well-imagined proportioning".

The Bush Tower influenced subsequent skyscraper design. Just to the east, the Wurlitzer Building at 116–122 West 42nd Street featured a similar "infill" design but with twice the bulk as the Bush Tower. Architect Raymond Hood credited the architects of the Bush Tower as an influence on his American Radiator Building of 1924, two blocks south on 40th Street. Compared to the Bush Tower, the American Radiator Building used a more modern form of the neo-Gothic style. An early scheme for Ralph Thomas Walker's Barclay-Vesey Building, further downtown, also used some of the "virile Gothic" themes used in the Bush Tower, according to architectural historian Robert A. M. Stern. For his part, Corbett drew attention to the Bush Tower by including an image of it in the Encyclopædia Britannica, accompanying his essay there.

== See also ==
- List of New York City Designated Landmarks in Manhattan from 14th to 59th Streets
