= Center for Architecture =

Cultural center in New York City

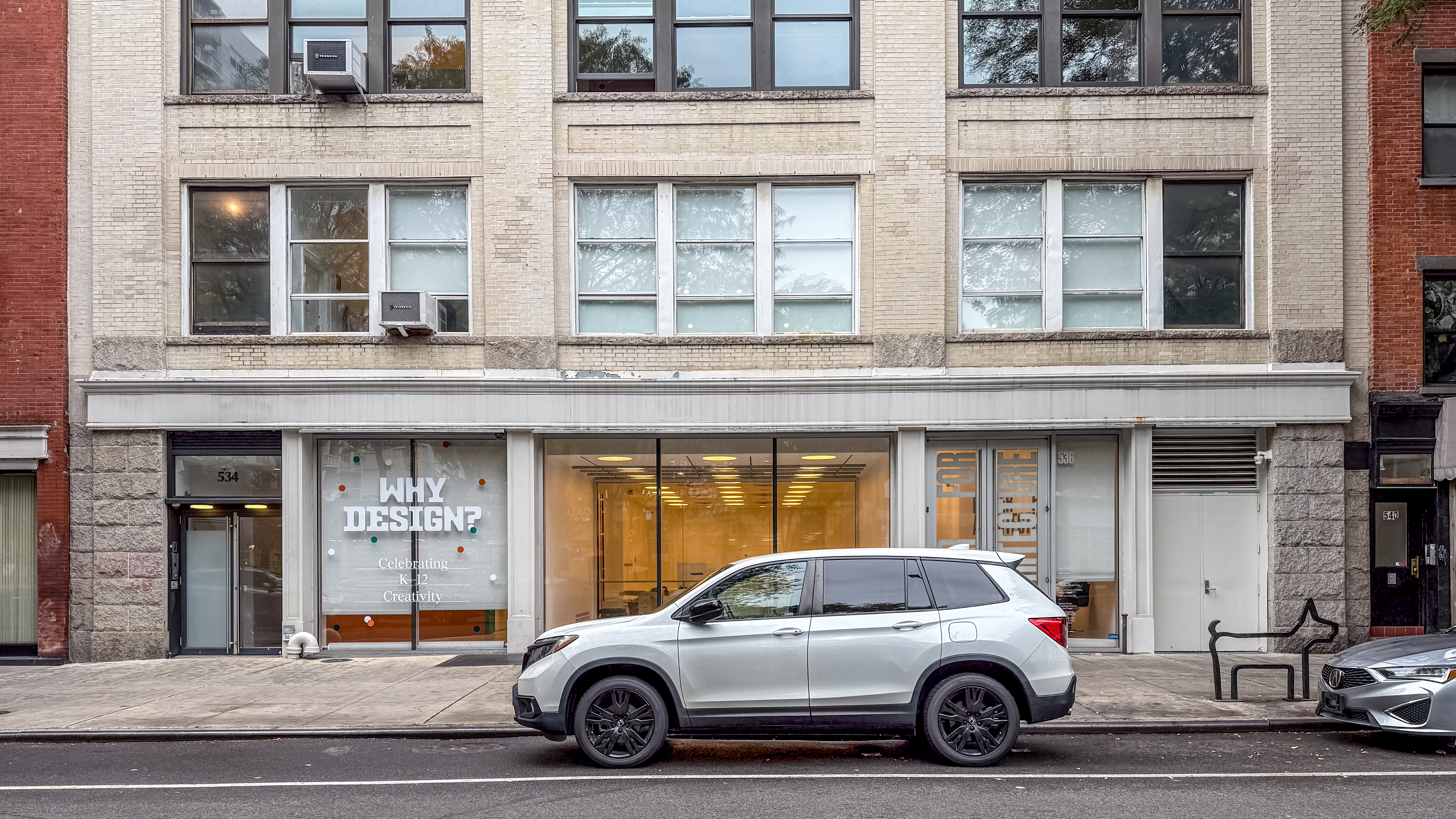
- The Center for Architecture (2024)
- Established: October 1, 2003
- Location: 536 LaGuardia Place between Bleecker Street and 3rd Street, New York, NY 10012
- Coordinates: 40.728690°N 73.998490°W
- Type: Cultural center
- Director: Jesse Lazar
- Website: www.centerforarchitecture.org

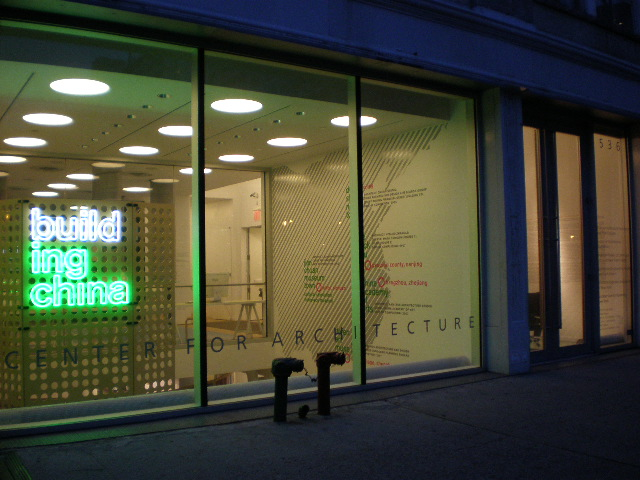
The Center for Architecture hosting an exhibit on "Building China"

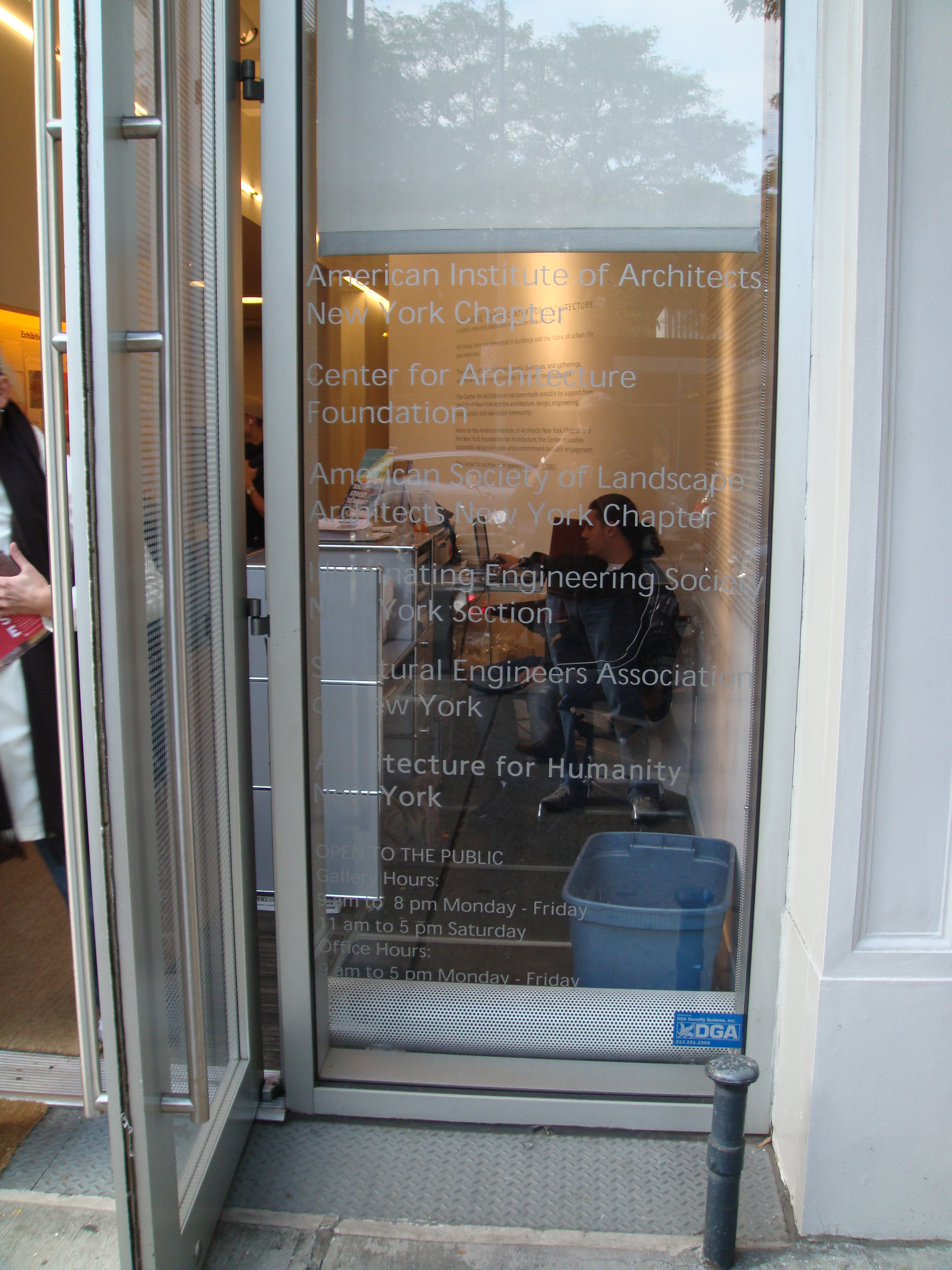
A number of partner organizations are housed at the Center for Architecture.

The Center for Architecture is located in the neighborhood of Greenwich Village at 536 LaGuardia Place, between West 3rd Street and Bleecker Street in Manhattan, New York City. The center was designed by architect Andrew Berman and completed in 2003. Since its inception, the center, operated by the New York Chapter of the American Institute of Architects, has become an increasingly important cultural institution through its revolving exhibits on architecture, urban planning, urban design, and environmental planning. The center also puts on seminars, public feedback forums, project unveilings, and educational programs, as well as events and changing exhibitions.

The Center for Architecture opened to the public in October 2003.

== Geothermal system ==
In the summer of 2003, the geothermal system for the Center for Architecture was installed. For three weeks, construction crews drilled two wells, each 1,260 feet (380 m) deep beneath the sidewalk. After drilling through layers or gravel, pea stone, overburden soil and bedrock, the wells were connected to make a closed loop system. The geothermal system consists of 6-inch-diameter (150 mm) pipes, heat exchangers and pumps for groundwater to flow through. The geothermal system cools the Center for Architecture during warm weather and heats it during the cold months by circulating water through heat exchangers. The system is based on the fact that the Earth's temperature at a thousand feet below Manhattan is a constant 52 °F (11 °C). The heat exchangers use the temperature of the water to cool (or heat as demand requires) the air released into the 12,000-square-foot (1,100 m^{2}) facility through air ducts. Air is blown over the chilled or heated water before traveling into the galleries and office spaces.

== See also ==
- List of museums and cultural institutions in New York City
- Philadelphia Center for Architecture
