= Old London Inc. =

Restaurant in New York City

Old London Inc. was the name of a proposed group of eating establishments begun by restaurant pioneer William Childs. Child's was deposed in 1929 as the head of the $37,000,000 Childs Restaurants chain. A 1930s undertaking, Childs' business eventually lost momentum during the Great Depression. It is significant because its founder was one of two brothers who began Childs Restaurants approximately four decades earlier.

On April 29, 1930, he opened a restaurant at Broadway and 102nd Street. Old Algiers, the first establishment, was a dinery adaptation of an Algerian village. The new chain advertised itself as unstandardized in contrast to the standardized type of eateries begun by Childs and his brother, Samuel S. Childs, in the 1890s. William Childs planned additional units to be added at the rate of ten to twelve per year.

Each was to have a theme patterned after an old world center, i.e. Old Normandy, Old Paris, France, and Old London, England. Located in the New York City metropolitan area, Childs' three nephews, Ellsworth, William, and Wallace, served as vice-president, secretary, and treasurer, respectively.

The second restaurant, Old London, was in a former Chase National Bank branch inside Bush Tower at 130 West 42nd St., next to Times Square, where Childs leased the bottom two floors and basement in March 1931. The restaurant business had officially been christened with the corporate name Old London Inc., by this time. Architects Pruitt & Brown planned to extensively modify the space in "old London style" for an eatery with a seating capacity of 1,000 diners. The former bank counter would be utilized as a luncheonette service bar.

Childs' venture did not result in a chain as he had hoped. He operated the Old Mill Inn, near his family farm in Franklin Corners, New Jersey, north of Bernardsville, prior to his death on May 22, 1938.
