= Hugh Ferriss =

American architect (1889–1962)

- Born: July 12, 1889; St. Louis, Missouri
- Died: January 28, 1962 (aged 72); Greenwich Village, New York City, New York
- Education: Washington University in St. Louis
- Occupations: Architect, delineator

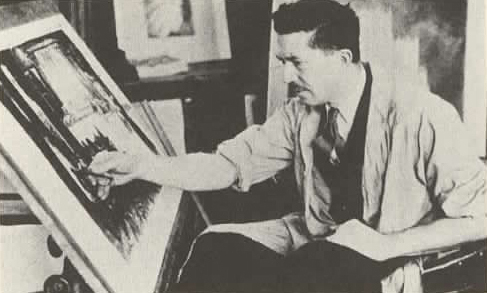
Hugh Ferriss at work, c. 1925

Hugh Macomber Ferriss (July 12, 1889 – January 28, 1962) was an American architect, illustrator, and poet. He was associated with exploring the psychological condition of modern urban life, a common cultural enquiry of the first decades of the twentieth century. After his death a colleague said he 'influenced my generation of architects' more than any other man." Ferriss also influenced popular culture, for example Gotham City (the setting for Batman), Kerry Conran's Sky Captain and the World of Tomorrow and Rapture from BioShock.

== Early life ==
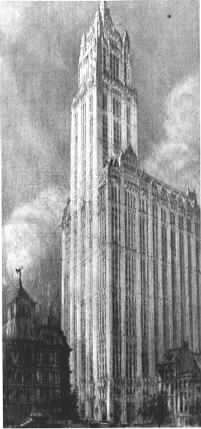
Woolworth Building, NYC

Ferriss was born in 1889 and trained as an architect at Washington University in St. Louis.

== Career ==
Early in his career, Ferriss began to specialize in creating architectural renderings for other architects' work rather than designing buildings himself. As an architectural delineator, his task was to create a perspective drawing of a building or project. This was done either as part of the sales process for a project, or, more commonly, to advertise or promote the project to a wider audience. Thus, his drawings were frequently destined for annual shows or advertisements. As a result of this, his works were often published (rather than just given to the architect's client), and Ferriss acquired a reputation. After he had set up as a free-lance artist, he found himself much sought after.

In 1912, Ferriss arrived in New York City and was soon employed as a delineator for Cass Gilbert. Some of his earliest drawings are of Gilbert's Woolworth Building; they reveal that Ferriss's illustrations had not yet developed his signature dark, moody appearance. In 1915, with Gilbert's blessing, he left the firm and set up shop as an independent architectural delineator. In 1914, Ferriss married Dorothy Lapham, an editor and artist for Vanity Fair.

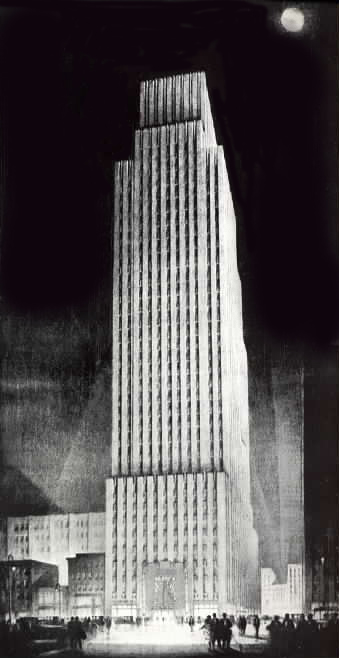
Daily News Building, NYC

By 1920, Ferriss had begun to develop his own style, frequently presenting the building at night, lit up by spotlights, or in a fog, as if photographed with a soft focus. The shadows cast by and on the building became almost as important as the revealed surfaces. His style elicited emotional responses from the viewer. His drawings were being regularly featured by such diverse publications as the Century Magazine, the Christian Science Monitor, Harper's Magazine, and Vanity Fair. His writings also began to appear in various publications.

In 1916, New York City had passed landmark zoning laws that regulated and limited the massing of buildings according to a formula. The reason was to counteract the tendency for buildings to occupy the whole of their lot and go straight up as far as was possible. Since many architects were not sure exactly what these laws meant for their designs, in 1922 the skyscraper architect Harvey Wiley Corbett commissioned Ferriss to draw a series of four step-by-step perspectives demonstrating the architectural consequences of the zoning law. These four drawings would later be used in his 1929 book The Metropolis of Tomorrow.

This book illustrated many conté crayon sketches of tall buildings. Some of the sketches were theoretical studies of possible setback variations within the 1916 zoning laws. Some were renderings for other architect's skyscrapers. And at the end of the book was a sequence of views in Manhattan emerged in an almost Babylonian guise. His writing in the book betrayed an ambivalence to the rapid urbanization of America:

There are occasional mornings when, with an early fog not yet dispersed, one finds oneself, on stepping onto the parapet, the spectator of an even more nebulous panorama. Literally, there is nothing to be seen but mist; not a tower has yet been revealed below, and except for the immediate parapet rail . . . there is no suggestion of either locality or solidity for the coming scene. To an imaginative spectator, it might seem that he is perched in some elevated stage box to witness some gigantic spectacle, some cyclopean drama of forms; and that the curtain has not yet risen . . . there could not fail to be at least a moment of wonder. What apocalypse is about to be revealed? What is its setting? And what will be the purport of this modern metropolitan drama?

In 1955, he was elected into the National Academy of Design as an Associate member, and became a full Academician in 1960.

== Death and legacy ==
Ferriss died in 1962. His archive, including drawings and papers, is held by the Drawings & Archives Department of the Avery Architectural and Fine Arts Library at Columbia University. Every year, the American Society of Architectural Illustrators gives out the Hugh Ferriss Memorial Prize for architectural rendering excellence. The medal features Ferriss's original "Fourth Stage" drawing, executed in bronze.

== Selected works ==
- The Liberty Memorial, Kansas City, Missouri. Harold Van Buren Magonigle, architect.
- The Four Stages
- Chicago Tribune Tower. Howells & Hood, architects.
- Players Club, Detroit, Michigan. Smith Hinchman & Grylls [SH&G], architects.
- Radiator Building, New York City. Raymond Hood, architect.
- Buhl Building, Detroit, Michigan. Smith Hinchman & Grylls [SH&G], architects.
- Chicago Board of Trade Building. Holabird & Root, architects.
- Penobscot Building, Detroit, Michigan. Smith Hinchman & Grylls [SH&G], architects.
- Guardian [Union Trust] Building, Detroit, Michigan. Smith Hinchman & Grylls [SH&G], architects.
- Telephone Building, St. Louis, Missouri. Mauran, Russell & Crowell and Timlin, architects.

== Selected publications ==
- Ferriss, Hugh. The Metropolis of Tomorrow, with essay by Carol Willis. New York: Princeton Architectural Press, 1986. Reprint of 1929 edition. ISBN 0-910413-11-8.
- Ferriss, Hugh. Power in Buildings, An Artist’s View of Contemporary Buildings. New York: Columbia University Press, 1953.
- Ferriss, Hugh. American Capitals of Industry: A Series of Drawings by Hugh Ferriss. Harpers Magazine, July 1919.
