= 1916 Zoning Resolution =

New York City zoning code

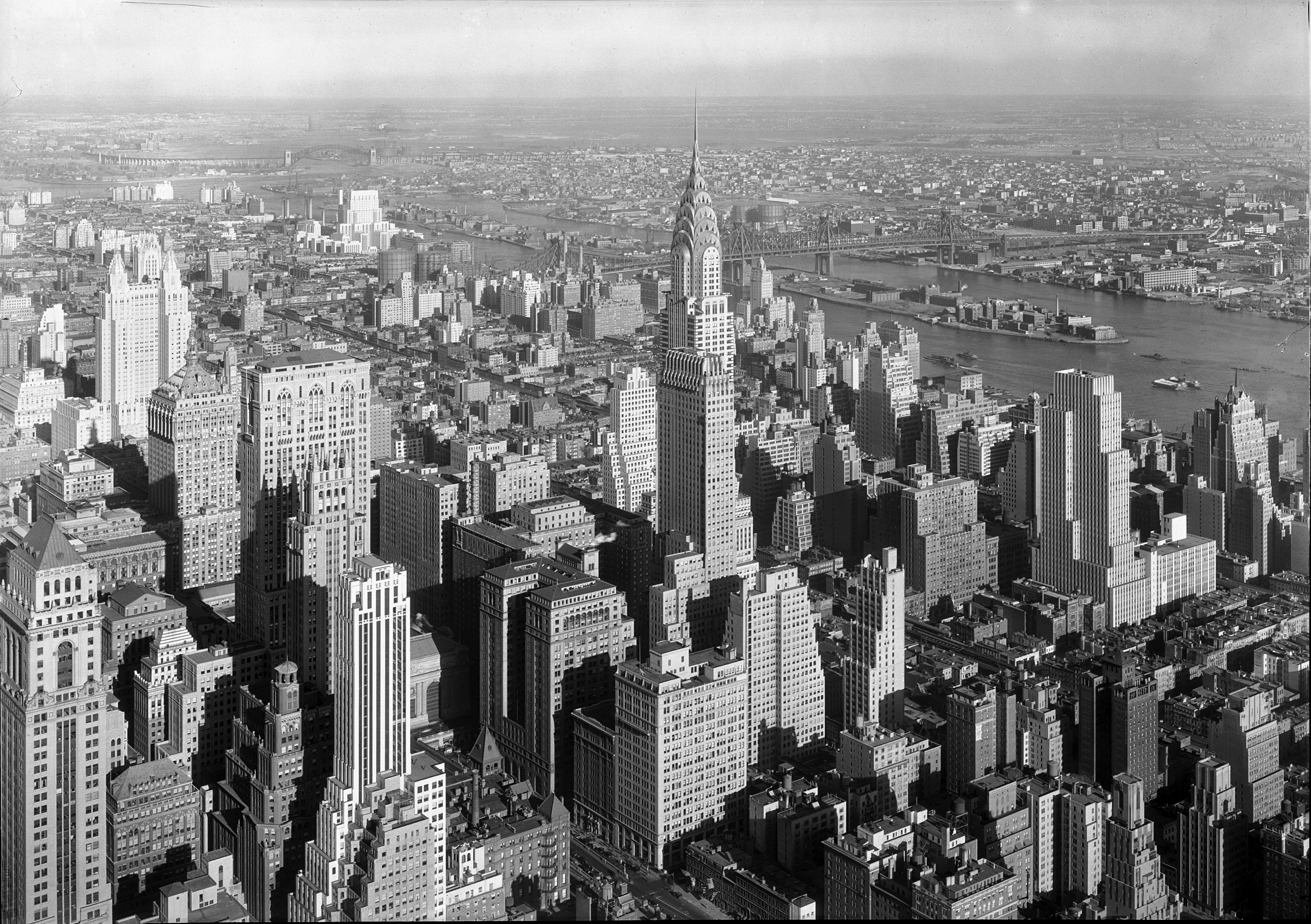
Midtown Manhattan in 1932 showing the results of the 1916 Zoning Resolution: many skyscrapers with setbacks.

Graph of the 1916 New York City zoning ordinance with an example elevation for an 80-foot street in a 2½-times height district

The 1916 Zoning Resolution in New York City was the first citywide zoning code in the United States. The zoning resolution reflected both borough and local interests, and was adopted primarily to stop massive buildings from preventing light and air from reaching the streets below. It also established limits in building massing at certain heights, usually interpreted as a series of setbacks and, while not imposing height limits, restricted towers to 25% of the lot size. The chief authors of this resolution were George McAneny and Edward M. Bassett.

== Impact ==
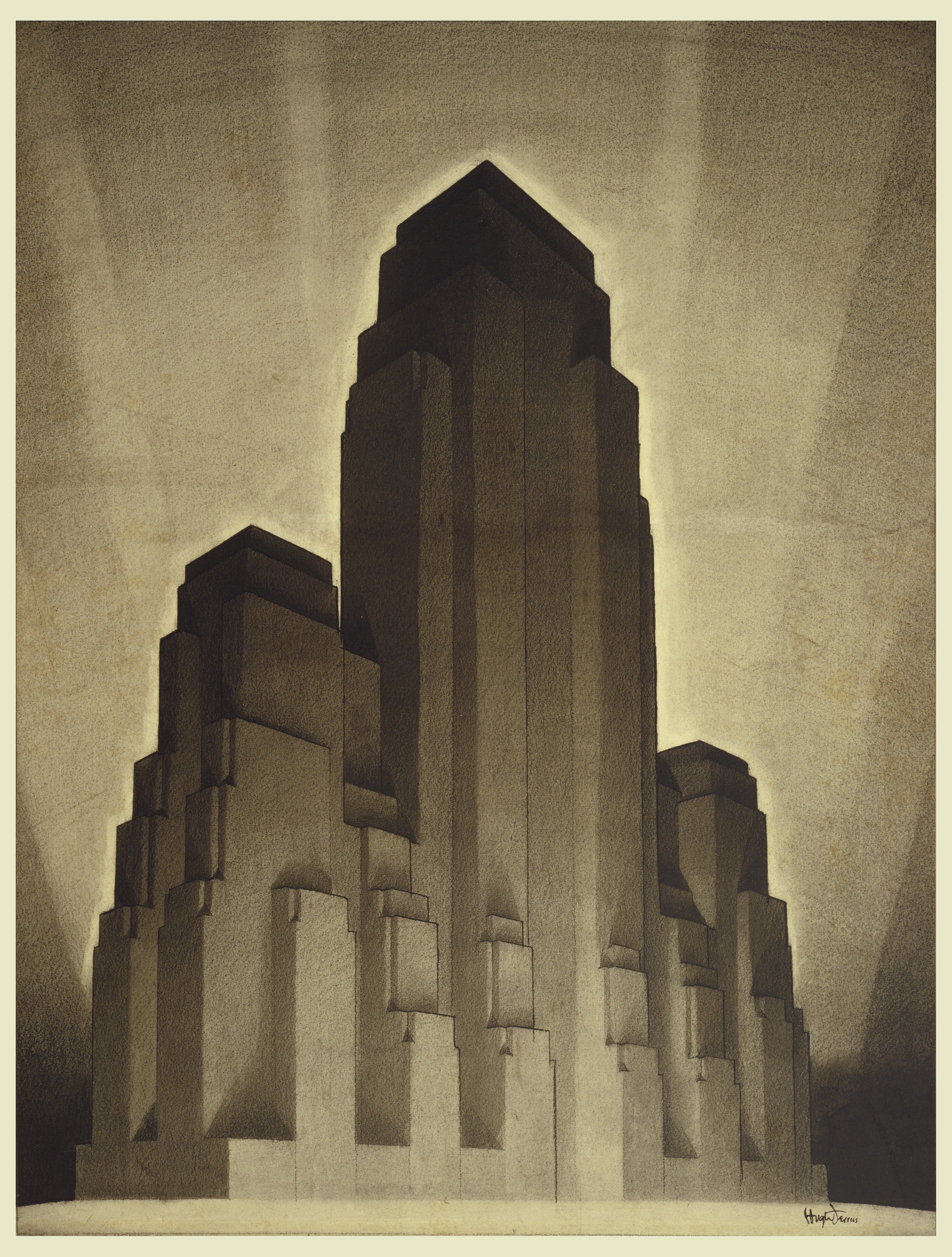
Study by Hugh Ferriss from The Metropolis of Tomorrow (1929) indicating the maximum mass permitted by the 1916 rules

The 1916 Zoning Resolution had a major impact on urban development in both the United States and internationally. Architectural delineator Hugh Ferriss popularized these new regulations in 1922 through a series of massing studies, clearly depicting the possible forms and how to maximize building volumes. "By the end of the 1920s the setback skyscraper, originally built in response to a New York zoning code, became a style that caught on from Chicago to Shanghai," observe Eric Peter Nash and Norman McGrath, discussing the Williamsburgh Savings Bank Building, which rose in isolation in Brooklyn, where no such zoning dictated form. The tiered Art Deco skyscrapers of the 1920s and 1930s are a direct result of this resolution.

== Legacy ==
By the mid-century most new International Style buildings had met the setback requirements by adopting the use of plazas or low-rise buildings surrounding a monolithic tower centered on the site. This approach was often criticized.

The New York City Department of City Planning passed the 1961 Zoning Resolution in October 1960, and the new zoning rules became effective in December 1961, superseding the 1916 Zoning Resolution. The new zoning solution used the Floor Area Ratio (FAR) regulation instead of setback rules. A building's maximum floor area is regulated according to the ratio that was imposed to the site where the building is located. Another feature of new zoning solution was adjacent public open space. If developers put adjacent public open space to their buildings, they could get additional area for their building as a bonus. This incentive bonus rule was created because of the strong influence from two representative skyscrapers. The Seagram Building by Mies van der Rohe with Philip Johnson, and Lever House by Skidmore, Owings & Merrill, introduced the new ideas about office building with open space. These buildings changed the skyline of New York City with both the advent of simple glass box design and their treatment of adjacent open spaces. The new zoning encouraged privately owned public space to ease the density of the city.

Zoning was further updated in 2024, when the New York City Council voted to update the city's zoning code to allow for a slight increase in residential density in certain zones or near transit, and a partial rollback of required parking in new development. This legislation was called "The City of Yes" and was signed by Eric Adams on December 5, 2024.

== See also ==
- Standard State Zoning Enabling Act
