= Carol Willis (architectural historian) =

American architect

- Born: 1949 (age 76–77)
- Education: Columbia University (M.A., M.Phil.); Boston University(B.A.)
- Occupation: Architect

Signature
- Architectural History; Urban History; Art History

Carol Willis is the founder, director, and curator of the Skyscraper Museum. She is also adjunct associate professor of Urban Studies at Columbia University. Herbert Muschamp described Willis in The New York Times as the “woman who created the Skyscraper Museum in 1996 from nothing but her imagination, her passion for New York architecture, and her belief in the importance of history and the value of the public realm.”

== Life ==
Willis graduated magna cum laude and Phi Beta Kappa from Boston University (B.A Art History, 1971.) She studied architectural history at Columbia University in the Department of Art History and Archaeology (M.A., 1976, M.Phil.,1979.)

Willis is the author of Form Follows Finance: Skyscrapers and Skylines in New York and Chicago. The book received an AIA book award and the "Best Book on North American Urbanism" in 1995 by the Urban History Association.

Willis is married to Mark Willis, a banker and adjunct professor of urban planning at NYU.

== Selected works ==
- Form Follows Finance: Skyscrapers and Skylines in New York and Chicago (Princeton Architectural Press, 1995: 2008)
- Building the Empire State (W.W. Norton, 1998)
- Introduction to Skyscraper Rivals by Daniel M Abramson (Princeton Architectural Press, 2000)
- The Lower Manhattan Plan Paperback, edited by Carol Willis, introduction by Ann Buttenwieser (Princeton Architectural Press, 2002)
- Introduction to New York Architecture: A History, photographs by Richard Berenholtz, text by Amanda Johnson (New York:Universe, 2003)
- Introduction to New York Deco by photographer Richard Berenholtz (Welcome Books, 2009)
