= Andrew Berman =

American preservation advocate

- Born: January 7, 1969 (age 57); The Bronx, New York City
- Education: Bronx High School of Science; Wesleyan University
- Occupation: Activist
- Title: Executive Director, Greenwich Village Society for Historic Preservation
- Website: site

Andrew Berman is an architectural and cultural heritage preservationist in New York City. He is known for being an opponent of new housing construction in New York City.

Berman has been executive director of the Greenwich Village Society for Historic Preservation (GVSHP), a neighborhood preservation organization in New York City, since 2002. He has been on the boards of the New York State Tenants and Neighbors Coalition, Housing Conservation Coordinators, the Chelsea Reform Democratic Club, the Hell's Kitchen Neighborhood Association, as well as founding member of the West Side Neighborhood Alliance and Friends of Pier 84 and member of the Board of Advisers of the Historic Districts Council.

== Early life and career ==
Berman was born and raised in the Bronx, New York, where he graduated from the Bronx High School of Science. He holds a BA in Art History from Wesleyan University, and lives and works on the West Side, Lower Manhattan.

Berman worked for New York City Councilmember Thomas Duane from 1993 to 1999, then for Duane as state senator until 2001. Under Duane, he focused on areas of education, transportation infrastructure, the environment, and senior services in Greenwich Village, Chelsea, and Hell's Kitchen.

== Preservation projects and advocacy ==
Under Berman's leadership, GVSHP has worked with other community groups to secure official landmark protections for around 1,100 buildings in Greenwich Village, the East Village, and NoHo, including 10 new historic districts or historic district extensions, and at least 40 individual landmarks. During his tenure, GVSHP also helped secure community-initiated contextual rezonings and downzonings of nearly 100 blocks of the East and West Village, designed to prevent new development, limit hotel and dormitory construction, preserve existing building stock, and retain and create affordable housing.

=== Opposition to development in New York City ===
Berman has lobbied to prevent the expansion of New York University within Greenwich Village, the East Village, NoHo, and satellite campuses. This includes his work with GVSHP to prevent NYU from building a planned 400-foot-tall tower on Bleecker Street, which would have been the tallest structure in Greenwich Village, Berman's participation in litigation blocking city approvals for NYU's planned 20-year expansion plan.

In late 2000s, GVSHP opposed a proposed expansion of St. Vincent Catholic Medical Center, a hospital in Greenwich Village, with Andrew Berman arguing that the plan would be "a blow to the distinctive historic character of Greenwich Village."

In the 2010s, the organization sought to block new construction on the Gansevoort Street, where low-rise meatpacking buildings stand. The organization also sought to block housing developments near Hudson River Park.

In 2020s, the organization advocated against rezoning of SoHo and NoHo to allow construction of thousands of new apartments with a small share at below-market rents. The plan was rejected by the Community Board by a 49–1 vote. Andrew Berman stated, "This upzoning approach of super luxury towers with a small set-aside for affordable units is bad for New York City, bad for our neighborhoods, and bad for affordability.”

In 2021, the New York City Council voted to approve the construction of 3,500 housing units (one quarter of which was devoted to affordable housing) in SoHo and NoHo in a 43–5 vote. Village Preservation lobbied against the construction project.

== Awards ==
- 2006 – Berman named one of New York magazine's "Influentials 2006"
- 2006 – GVSHP wins the New York Landmarks Conservancy’s Lucy G. Moses Organizational Excellence Award
- 2006 – GVSHP named one of the "Best of NYC 2006" by the Village Voice, which called it the "Best Greenwich Village Defender."
- 2007 – GVSHP wins the Preservation League of New York State’s "Excellence in Historic Preservation" award.
- 2008 – Berman named one of the "100 Most Powerful People in Real Estate" by The New York Observer, the only preservationist to be included on the list.
- 2013 – Berman named to the Vanity Fair "Hall of Fame" for his preservation work at GVSHP.
