= Hackensack station (New York, Susquehanna and Western Railroad) =

Former railway station in New Jersey, US

Hackensack
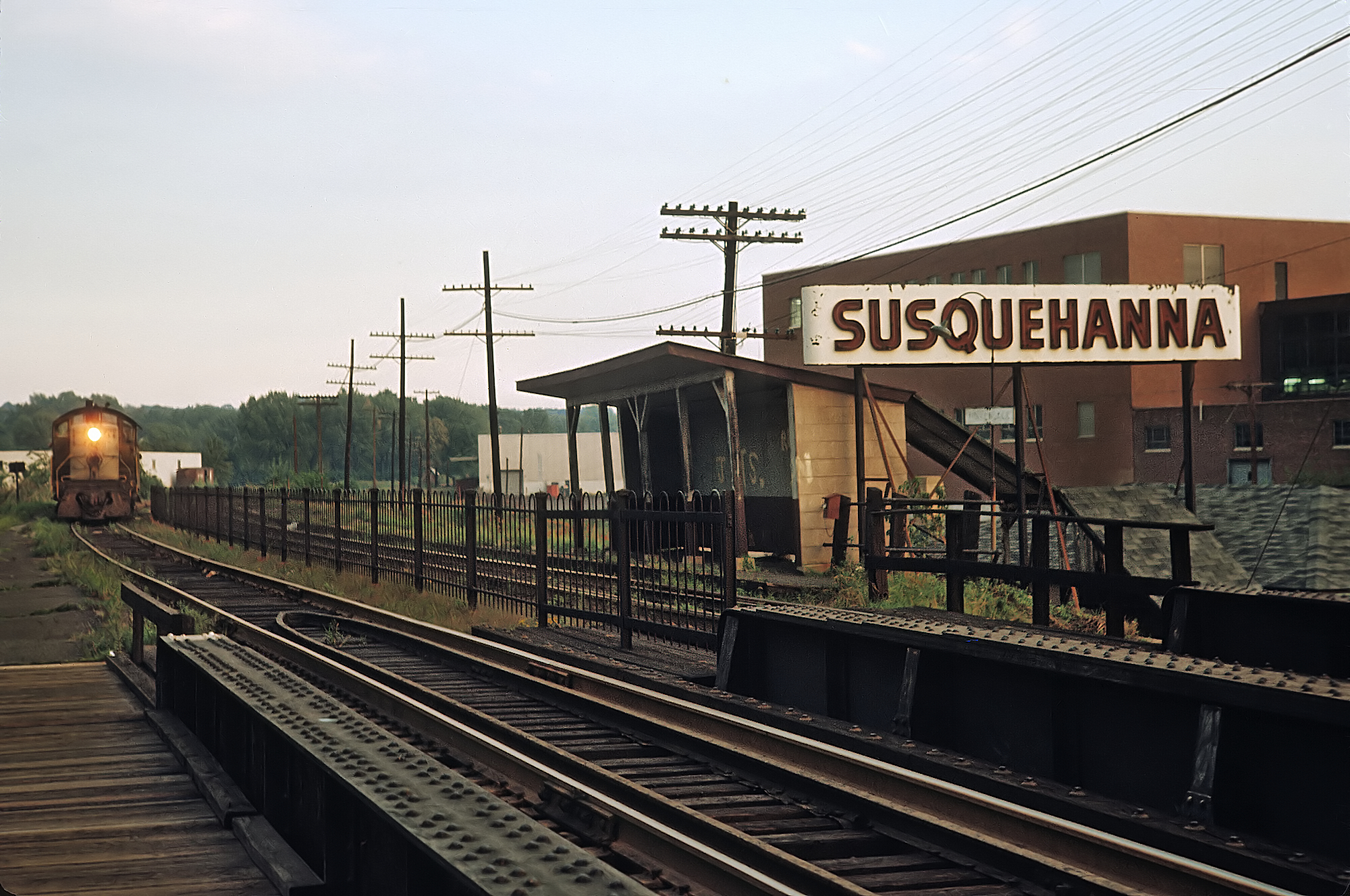
- NYS&W suburban train approaching Hackensack, River Street in 1965

General information
- Location: Main Street at Mercer Street; Hackensack, New Jersey
- Coordinates: 40.883879°N 74.042820°W
- Owner: New York, Susquehanna and Western Railroad
- Lines: NYS&W Main Line
- Platforms: 1 side platform
- Tracks: 2

Other information
- Station code: 1085 (Erie Railroad); HK (NYS&W)

History
- Opened: 1872; 154 years ago
- Closed: June 30, 1966; 60 years ago
- Rebuilt: at River Street; September 1949–June 29, 1950
- Electrified: Not electrified

Services
Preceding station	New York, Susquehanna and Western Railroad	Following station
Prospect Avenue toward Stroudsburg	Main Line	Bogota toward Susquehanna Transfer or Jersey City
Location

Hackensack was a railroad station in Hackensack, New Jersey on the New York, Susquehanna and Western Railway Main Line, which provided passenger service between the 1870s and 1960s. The station at Main and Mercer Streets opened in 1872; it was replaced with one at River Street in 1950. Public Service trolley lines served both stations.

== History ==
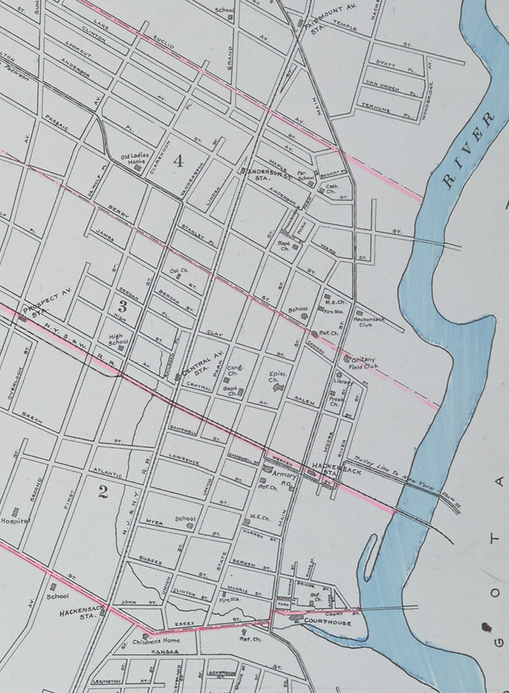
1905 map showing rail and trolley lines and stations in Hackensack

The Hoboken, Ridgefield and Paterson Railroad was chartered in 1866 to connect Paterson with the ports along the North River (Hudson River). The New Jersey Midland Railway (NJM) was formed in 1870 as a consolidation of several smaller railroads.

By March 1872, the line had been extended west through Maywood Paterson, Wortendyke, and Butler to Newfoundland. It was later extended to Sparta, Newton, Blairstown and across the Delaware River to Stroudsburg, Pennsylvania. Soon thereafter, trains running east and south to the Hudson Waterfront via Marion Junction and the Bergen Hill Cut to Pennsylvania Railroad's depot in Jersey City, where transfer was possible to the Jersey City Ferry.

The NJ Midland was absorbed into the New York, Susquehanna and Western Railroad. In 1898, the NYSW became a subsidiary of the Erie Railroad, and made use of Erie's Pavonia Terminal and the Pavonia Ferry or to Susquehanna Transfer, which provided transfer to buses through the Lincoln Tunnel to the Port Authority Bus Terminal.

The station at Main Street was replaced with one at River Street on June 29, 1950. Both were also stops on the Public Service trolley line. There was also a NYSW station in the city at Prospect Avenue. Passenger service on the line was eliminated June 30, 1966; it is now used for exclusively for freight.

Rail service running north–south in Hackensack began in 1865 and was operated by the Hackensack and New York Railroad, which was later reorganized as the New Jersey and New York Railroad and in 1896 leased by the Erie Railroad, though there was no interchange with the NYS&W. The right of way is now New Jersey Transit Rail Operations's Pascack Valley Line, with stations at Essex Street and Anderson Street.

== Future ==
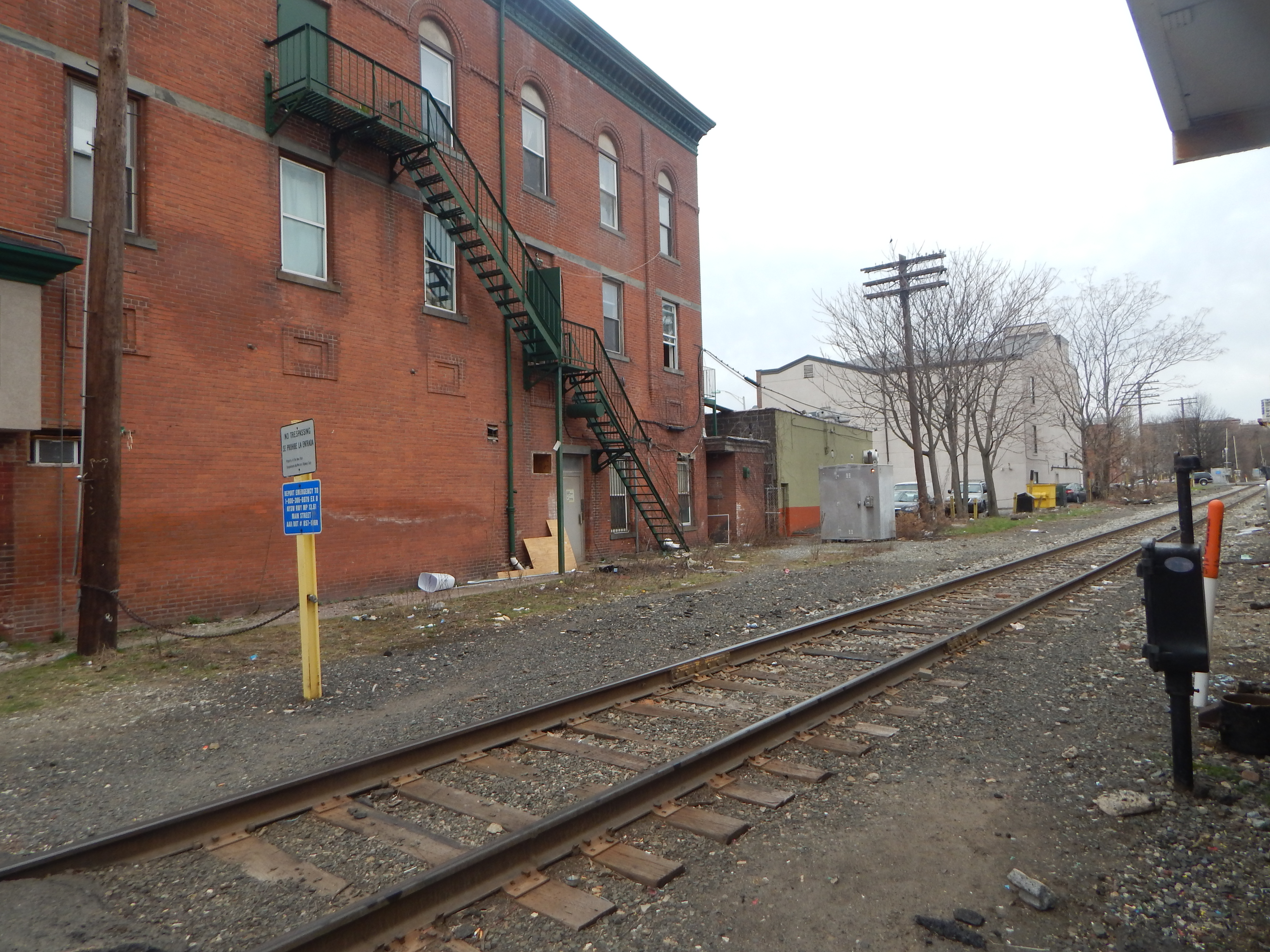
Building at Main and Mercer streets in Hackensack along the NYS&W right-of-way, 2015

The Passaic–Bergen–Hudson Transit Project is a project by New Jersey Transit (NJT) to reintroduce passenger service on a portion of the New York, Susquehanna and Western Railway (NYSW) right-of-way in Passaic, Bergen and Hudson counties using newly built, FRA-compliant diesel multiple unit rail cars. A potential station at this location, close to Hackensack Bus Terminal, would be called Downtown–River Street. While outside of the scope of the project the railroad and the city of Hackensack replaced a rail trestle close to the proposed station in 2013 with a contingency for a future additional track and passenger platform.

== See also ==
- NYSW (passenger 1939–1966) map
- Operating Passenger Railroad Stations Thematic Resource (New Jersey)

== Bibliography ==
- Carlough, Curtis V.; Fredericks, Harold; Stuy, Timothy; Van Dyk, Fred (1999). The Next Station Will Be... Volume 1 (Revised). New Jersey Midland Railroad Historical Society, Inc. ISBN 9780941652155.
