= Bogota station =

Former railway station in Bogota, New Jersey, US

Bogota
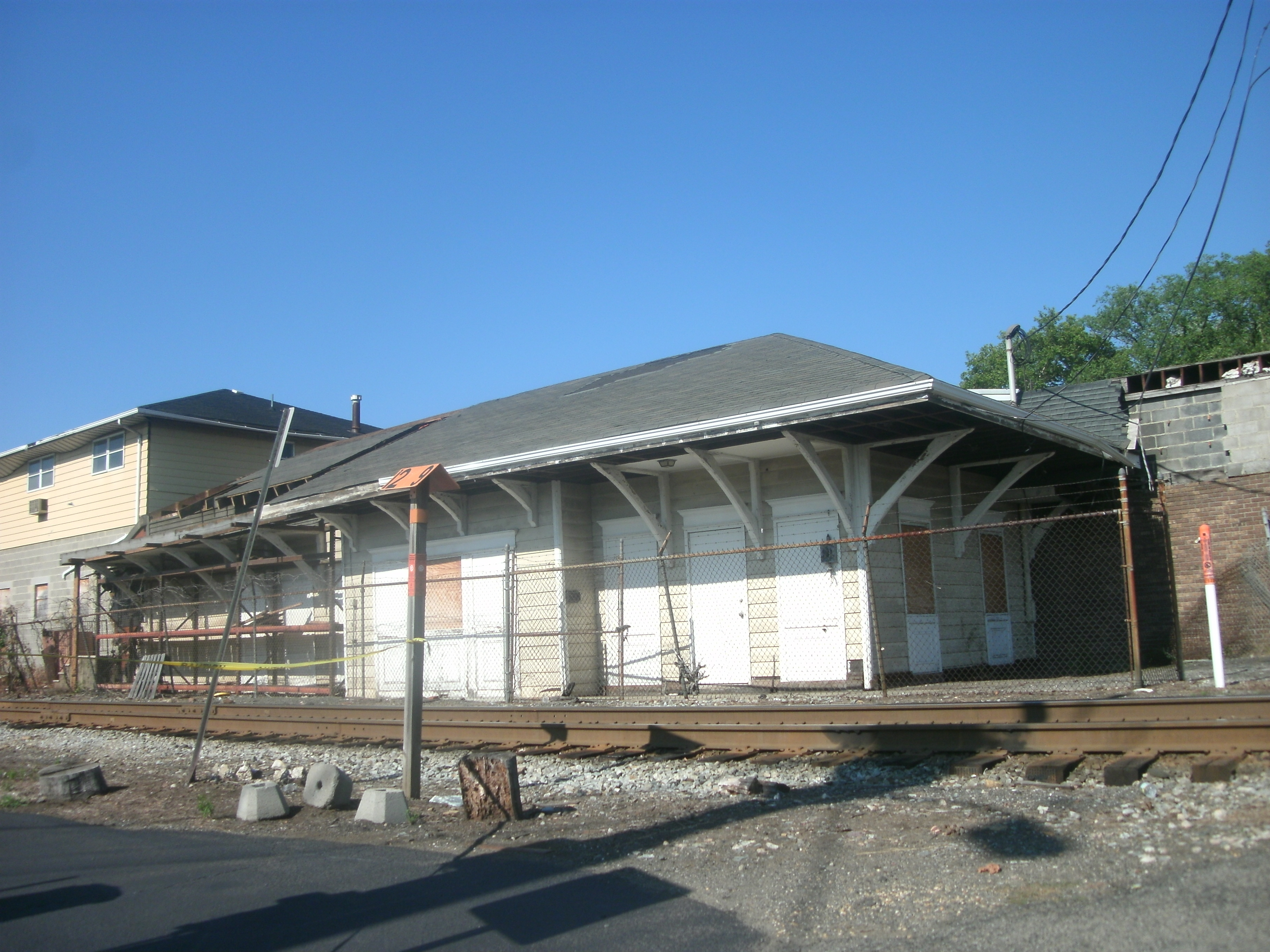
- Bogota station in 2011.

General information
- Location: 157 West Fort Lee Road, Bogota, Bergen County, New Jersey 07603
- Coordinates: 40.8772153°N 74.0339805°W
- Owner: New York, Susquehanna and Western Railroad
- Lines: NYS&W Main Line
- Platforms: 1 side platform
- Tracks: 2

Other information
- Station code: 1081 (Erie Railroad); FO (NYS&W)

History
- Opened: 1872; 154 years ago
- Closed: June 30, 1966; 60 years ago
- Electrified: Not electrified

Key dates
- September 6, 1958: Station agency closed

Services
Preceding station	New York, Susquehanna and Western Railroad	Following station
Hackensack toward Stroudsburg	Main Line	Ridgefield Park toward Susquehanna Transfer or Jersey City
Location

Bogota was a railroad station in Bogota, New Jersey, at Court Street/Fort Lee Road west of River Road and east of the Court Street Bridge over the Hackensack River. It was located on the New York, Susquehanna and Western Railway Main Line, which provided passenger service between the 1870s and 1960s.

== History ==
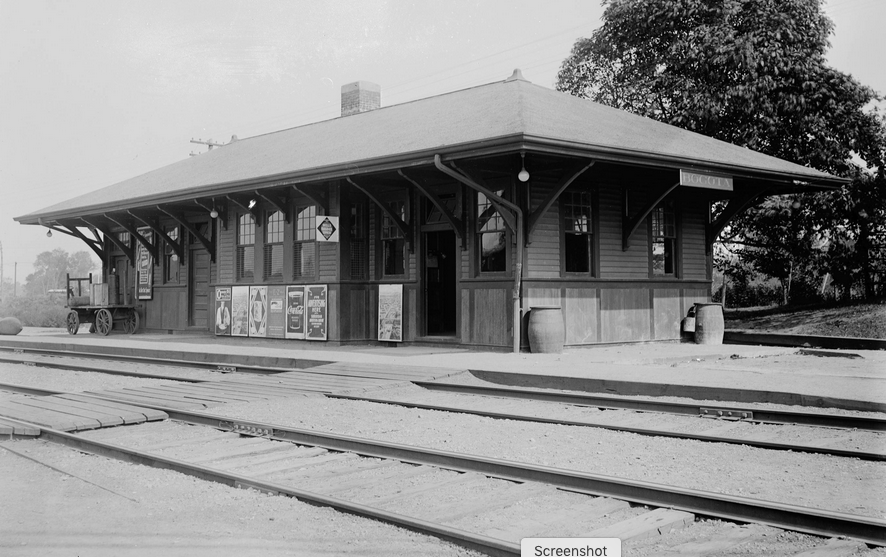
James E. Bailey's photo of the Bogota station between 1908–1912

The Hoboken, Ridgefield and Paterson Railroad was chartered in 1866 to connect Paterson with the ports along the Hudson River waterfront. The New Jersey Midland Railway (NJM) was formed in 1870 as a consolidation of several smaller railroads.

By March 1872, the NJM line had been extended west from Hackensack, with stations at Maywood, Paterson (at Vreeland Avenue and two others) Wortendyke, and Butler, among others, to Newfoundland. It was later extended to Sparta, Newton, Blairstown and across the Delaware River to Stroudsburg, Pennsylvania. Soon thereafter trains were running east and south to the Hudson River waterfront at Pennsylvania Railroad's depot in Jersey City using the Bergen Hill Cut.

The NJ Midland was absorbed into the New York, Susquehanna and Western Railroad. In 1898, the NYSW became a subsidiary of the Erie Railroad, and made use of Erie's Pavonia Terminal. Passenger service on the line was eliminated June 30, 1966; it is now used for exclusively for freight.

The station was north of Hackensack Junction, where the NYSW heading southward ran parallel to the West Shore Railroad, now CSX River Subdivision.

The location is potential station of New Jersey Transit Rail Operations proposed Passaic–Bergen–Hudson Transit Project which would be call West Fort Lee Road.

== See also ==
- NYSW (passenger 1939-1966) diagram
- Operating Passenger Railroad Stations Thematic Resource (New Jersey)

== Bibliography ==
- Carlough, Curtis V.; Fredericks, Harold; Stuy, Timothy; Van Dyk, Fred (1999). The Next Station Will Be... Volume 1 (Revised). New Jersey Midland Railroad Historical Society, Inc. ISBN 9780941652155.
