= Wyckoff station =

Former railway station in Bergen County, New Jersey, US

Wyckoff
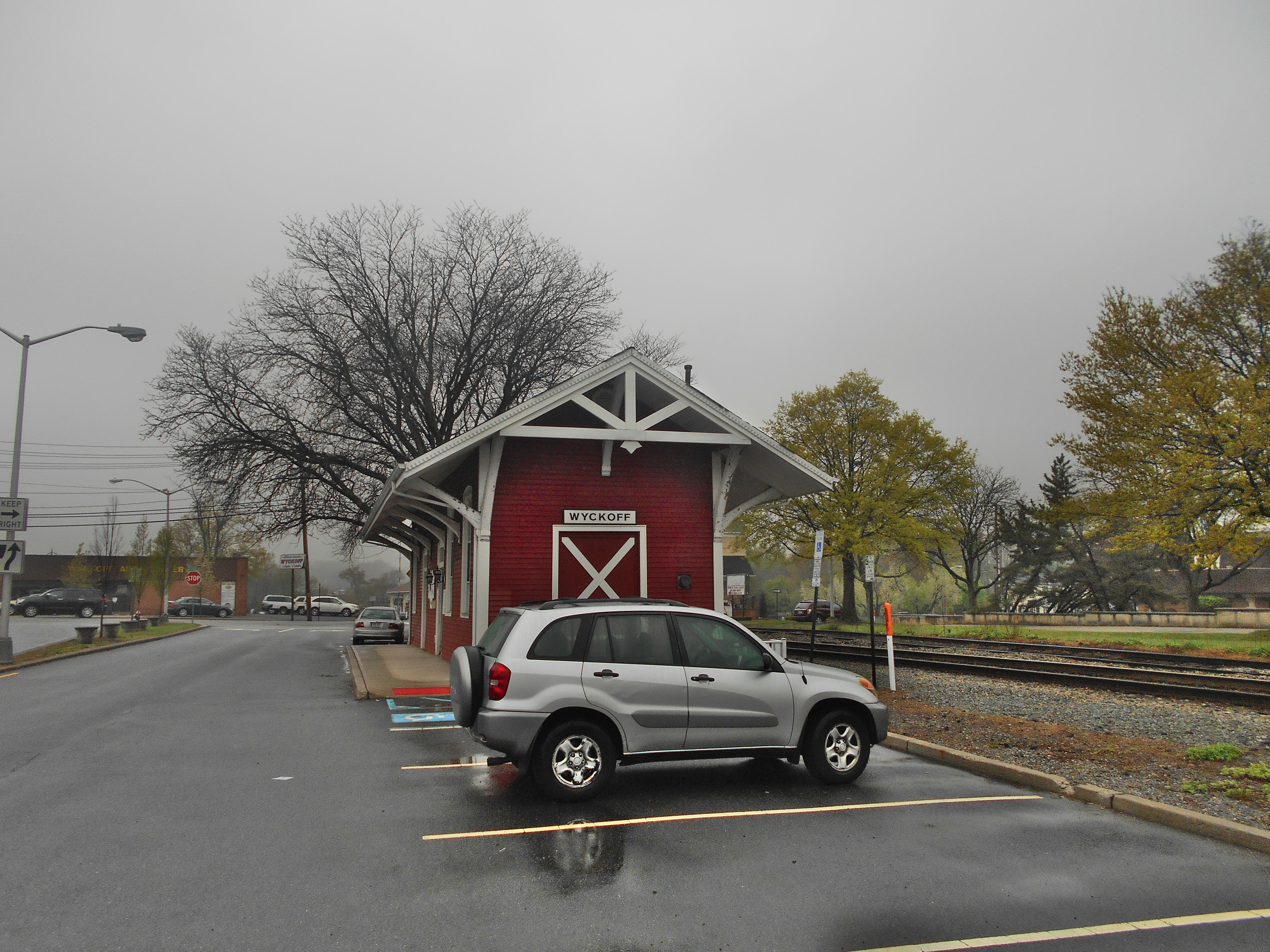
- Wyckoff station in May 2014.

General information
- Location: 399 Main Street, Wyckoff, New Jersey 07481
- Owner: New York, Susquehanna and Western Railroad
- Lines: New York, Susquehanna and Western Railroad
- Platforms: 1 side platform
- Tracks: 1

Other information
- Station code: 1133 (Erie Railroad); WY (NYS&W)

History
- Opened: April 8, 1871; 155 years ago
- Closed: June 30, 1966; 60 years ago
- Electrified: Not electrified

Services
Preceding station	New York, Susquehanna and Western Railroad	Following station
Campgaw toward Stroudsburg	Main Line	Wortendyke toward Susquehanna Transfer or Jersey City

Wyckoff is a former commuter railroad train station in the township of Wyckoff, Bergen County, New Jersey. The station served trains of the New York, Susquehanna and Western Railway between Pavonia Terminal in Jersey City (until 1958) or Susquehanna Transfer in North Bergen (until 1966) to the station in Butler. The next station east was Wortendyke in Midland Park while the next one west was Campgaw station in Franklin Lakes. Wyckoff station consisted of one track and one low-level side platform for passenger service.

Railroad service in Wyckoff began on April 8, 1871 when the New Jersey Midland Railway commenced train operations to Pompton Township. Railroad service continued until June 30, 1966.

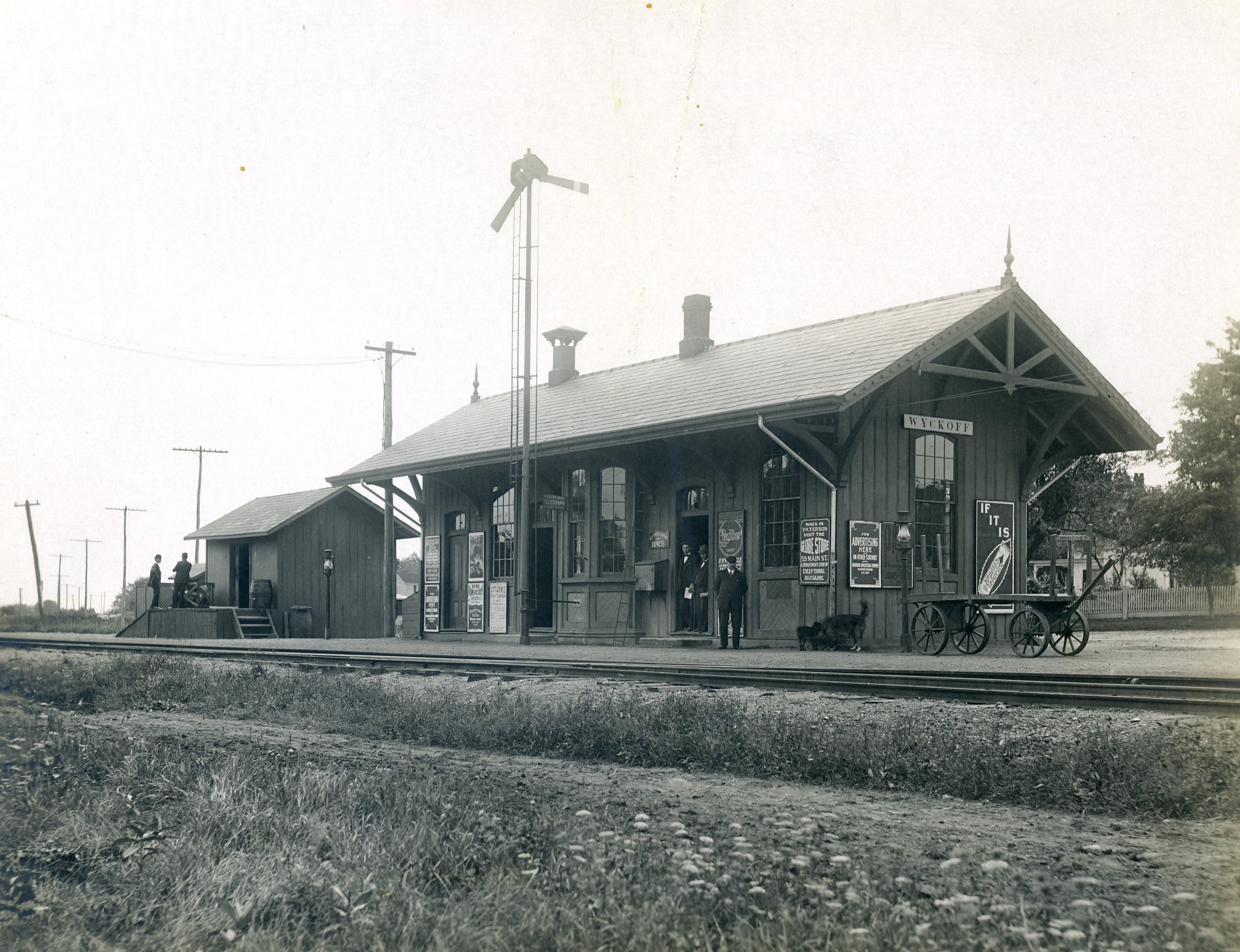
Wyckoff station c. 1907–1912

== Station layout ==
Outbound	← New York, Susquehanna and Western Railroad weekdays toward Butler (Campgaw)
Inbound	New York, Susquehanna and Western Railroad weekdays toward Susquehanna Transfer (Wortendyke) →
Side platform, station depot (Note: The termini of Butler and Susquehanna Transfer recognize the destinations at the end of passenger service on June 30, 1966.)

== See also ==
- NYSW (passenger 1939-1966) map
- Operating Passenger Railroad Stations Thematic Resource (New Jersey)

== Bibliography ==
- Carlough, Curtis V.; Fredericks, Harold; Stuy, Timothy; Van Dyk, Fred (1999). The Next Station Will Be... Volume 1 (Revised). New Jersey Midland Railroad Historical Society, Inc. ISBN 9780941652155.
- Catlin, George L. (1872). Homes on the Midland for New York Business Men. New York, New York: J. W. Pratt.
- Mohowski, Robert E. (2003). The New York, Susquehanna & Western Railroad. Johns Hopkins University Press. ISBN 0-8018-7222-7.
