= Newfoundland station (New York, Susquehanna and Western Railroad) =

Newfoundland
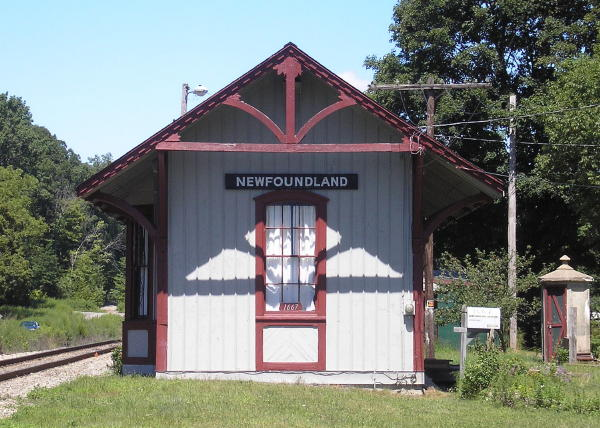

General information
- Location: 58 Bigelow Road, Newfoundland, Jefferson Township, New Jersey 07435
- Coordinates: 41°02′54.6″N 74°26′39.4″W
- Owner: New York, Susquehanna and Western Railroad
- Lines: New York, Susquehanna and Western Railroad
- Platforms: 1 side platform
- Tracks: 1

Other information
- Station code: 1161 (Erie Railroad); NW (NYS&W)

History
- Opened: 1872; 154 years ago
- Closed: 1944; 82 years ago
- Electrified: Not electrified

Services
Preceding station	New York, Susquehanna and Western Railroad	Following station
Oak Ridge toward Stroudsburg	Main Line	Charlotteburgh toward Susquehanna Transfer or Jersey City
Location

Newfoundland is a railroad station in the Newfoundland section of Jefferson Township, New Jersey. It was built by the New Jersey Midland Railway in 1872 and later served passengers on the New York, Susquehanna and Western Railroad (NYS&W).

The station is prominently featured in the critically acclaimed and award-winning 2003 independent film The Station Agent starring Peter Dinklage. The station interior was later renovated and marketed as a multiple-use studio.

== NJ Midland/NYSW stations ==
Existing original station buildings from the New Jersey Midland can be found at Bogota, Vreeland Avenue, Hawthorne, Wortendyke, Wyckoff and Butler, among other places.

== See also ==
- Whippany Railway Museum
- NYSW (passenger 1939–1966) map
- Operating Passenger Railroad Stations Thematic Resource (New Jersey)

== Bibliography ==
- Carlough, Curtis V.; Fredericks, Harold; Stuy, Timothy; Van Dyk, Fred (1999). The Next Station Will Be... Volume 1 (Revised). New Jersey Midland Railroad Historical Society, Inc. ISBN 9780941652155.
