= Vreeland Avenue station =

Former railway station in Paterson, New Jersey, US

Coordinates: 40.895462°N 74.13674°W

Vreeland Avenue
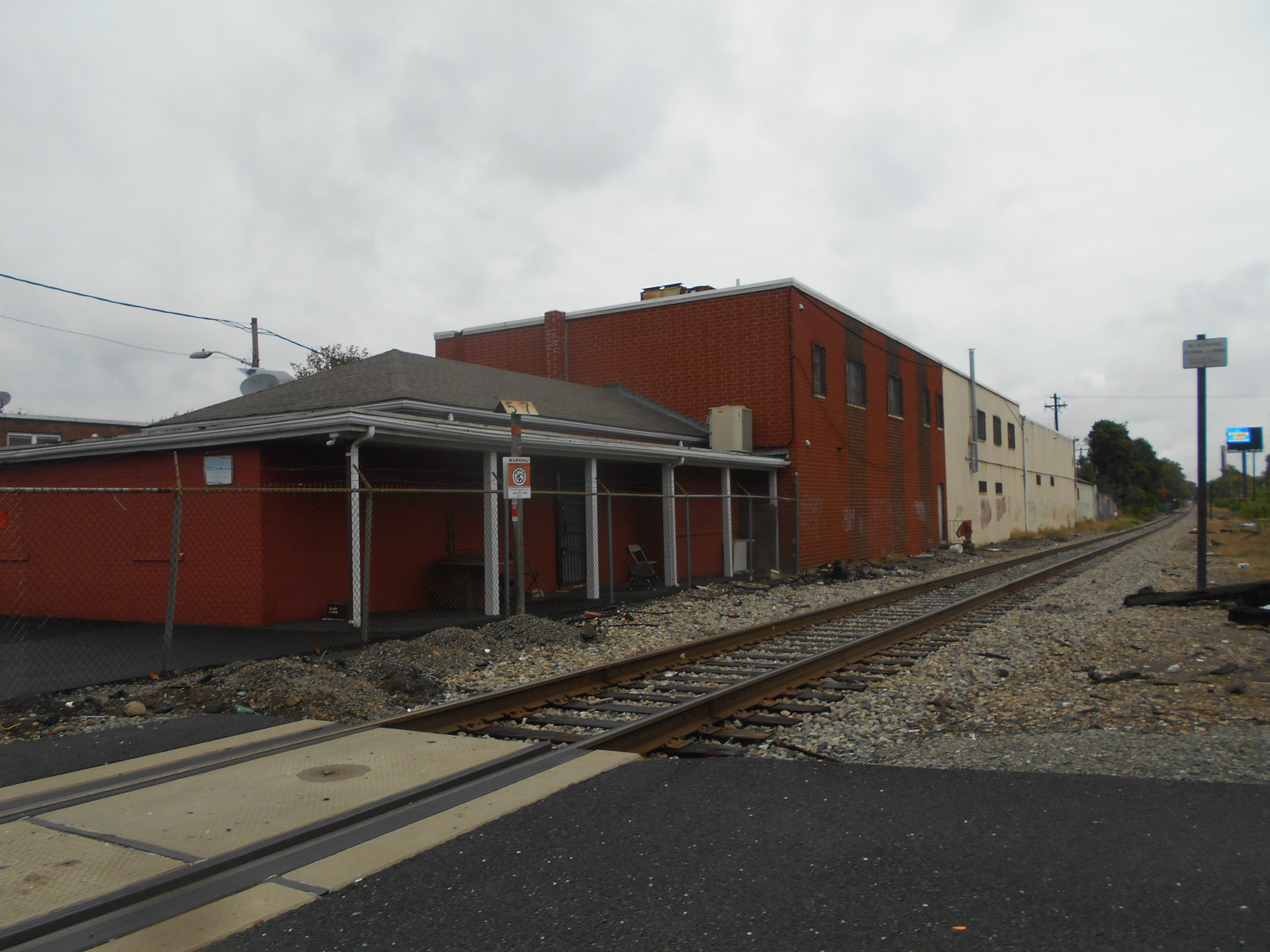
- Vreeland Avenue station in October 2014.

General information
- Location: 265 Vreeland Avenue, Paterson, New Jersey
- Owner: New York, Susquehanna and Western Railroad
- Line: New York, Susquehanna and Western Railroad
- Platforms: 1 side platform
- Tracks: 1

Other information
- Station code: 1113 (Erie Railroad); VA (NYS&W)

History
- Opened: 1873; 153 years ago
- Closed: June 30, 1966; 60 years ago
- Rebuilt: September 20, 1949
- Electrified: Not electrified

Services
Preceding station	New York, Susquehanna and Western Railroad	Following station
Broadway–Paterson toward Stroudsburg	Main Line	East Paterson toward Susquehanna Transfer or Jersey City
Location

Vreeland Avenue was a railroad station in Paterson, New Jersey served by the New York, Susquehanna and Western Railroad (NYS&W). until 1966. Service by the New Jersey Midland, a predecessor to the NYS&W, had begun in 1873. The station house dates to 1949. Other extant station buildings from the New Jersey Midland/NYSW can be found at Wortendyke, Butler, and Newfoundland, among other places.

The location in the People's Park neighborhood is potential station of New Jersey Transit Rail Operations proposed Passaic–Bergen–Hudson Transit Project.

== See also ==
- NYSW (passenger 1939–1966) map
- Operating Passenger Railroad Stations Thematic Resource (New Jersey)

== Bibliography ==
- Carlough, Curtis V.; Fredericks, Harold; Stuy, Timothy; Van Dyk, Fred (1999). The Next Station Will Be... Volume 1 (Revised). New Jersey Midland Railroad Historical Society, Inc. ISBN 9780941652155.
