= Wortendyke station =

Former railroad station in Bergen County, New Jersey, US

Wortendyke
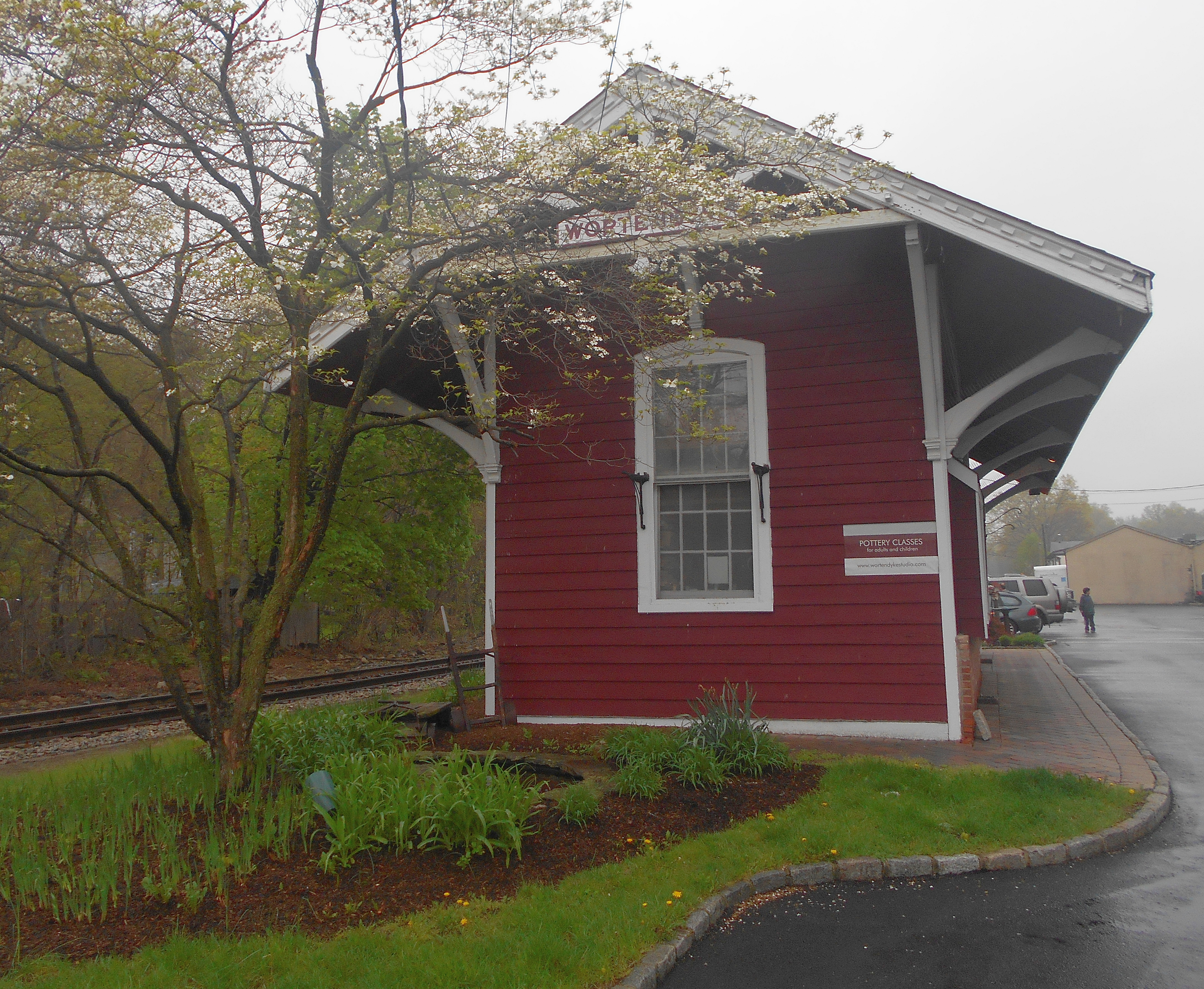
- Wortendyke station in May 2014.

General information
- Location: 211 Greenwood Avenue; Midland Park, New Jersey 07432
- Coordinates: 40.9975°N 74.150278°W
- Owner: New York, Susquehanna and Western Railroad
- Lines: New York, Susquehanna and Western Railroad
- Platforms: 1 side platform
- Tracks: 1 (NYSW)

Construction
- Accessible: yes

Other information
- Station code: 1131 (Erie Railroad); W (NYS&W)

History
- Opened: April 8, 1871; 155 years ago
- Closed: June 30, 1966; 60 years ago
- Electrified: Not electrified

Services
Preceding station	New York, Susquehanna and Western Railroad	Following station
Wyckoff toward Stroudsburg	Main Line	Midland Park toward Susquehanna Transfer or Jersey City
Location

Wortendyke is a former commuter railroad train station in the borough of Midland Park, Bergen County, New Jersey. The station serviced passenger and freight trains of the New York, Susquehanna and Western Railway between Pavonia Terminal in Jersey City and Butler station until December 12, 1958, when the former changed its destination to Susquehanna Transfer in North Bergen. The next station eastbound was the namesake Midland Park station and westbound was Wyckoff. Wortendyke station consisted of a single low-level side platform with the 50 by 16 feet (15.2 m × 4.9 m) wooden frame station depot.

== History ==
Interest in railroad service in Franklin Township began with the proposed New Jersey Western Railroad, a project of entrepreneur Cornelius A. Wortendyke. However, passenger service began on April 8, 1871, when the New Jersey Midland Railroad began service to Pompton Township (modern-day Pompton Lakes). Upon the opening of the railroad, railroad shops were established at Midland Avenue in the Wortendyke area. The facility included a 46 by 89 feet (14 m × 27 m) roundhouse and a 58-foot (18 m) diameter turntable. The shops lasted until 1897, when they burned down. Instead of rebuilding, the railroad chose to move the works facility to North Hawthorne.

Passenger service through Midland Park and Wortendyke station continued on the Susquehanna Railroad until service wax discontinued service on June 30, 1966. The station depot currently serves as the home of a pottery studio.

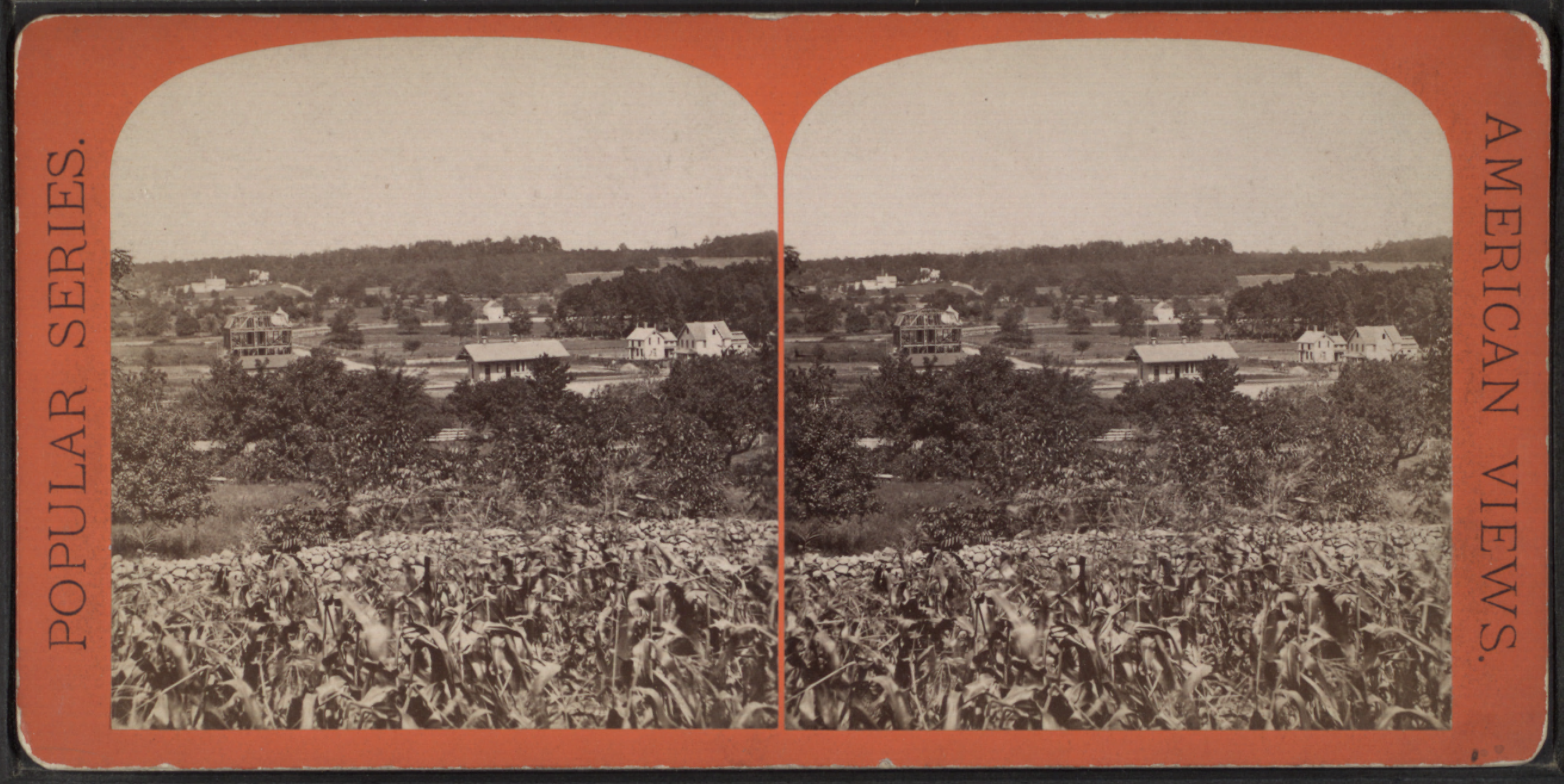
Stereoscopic view

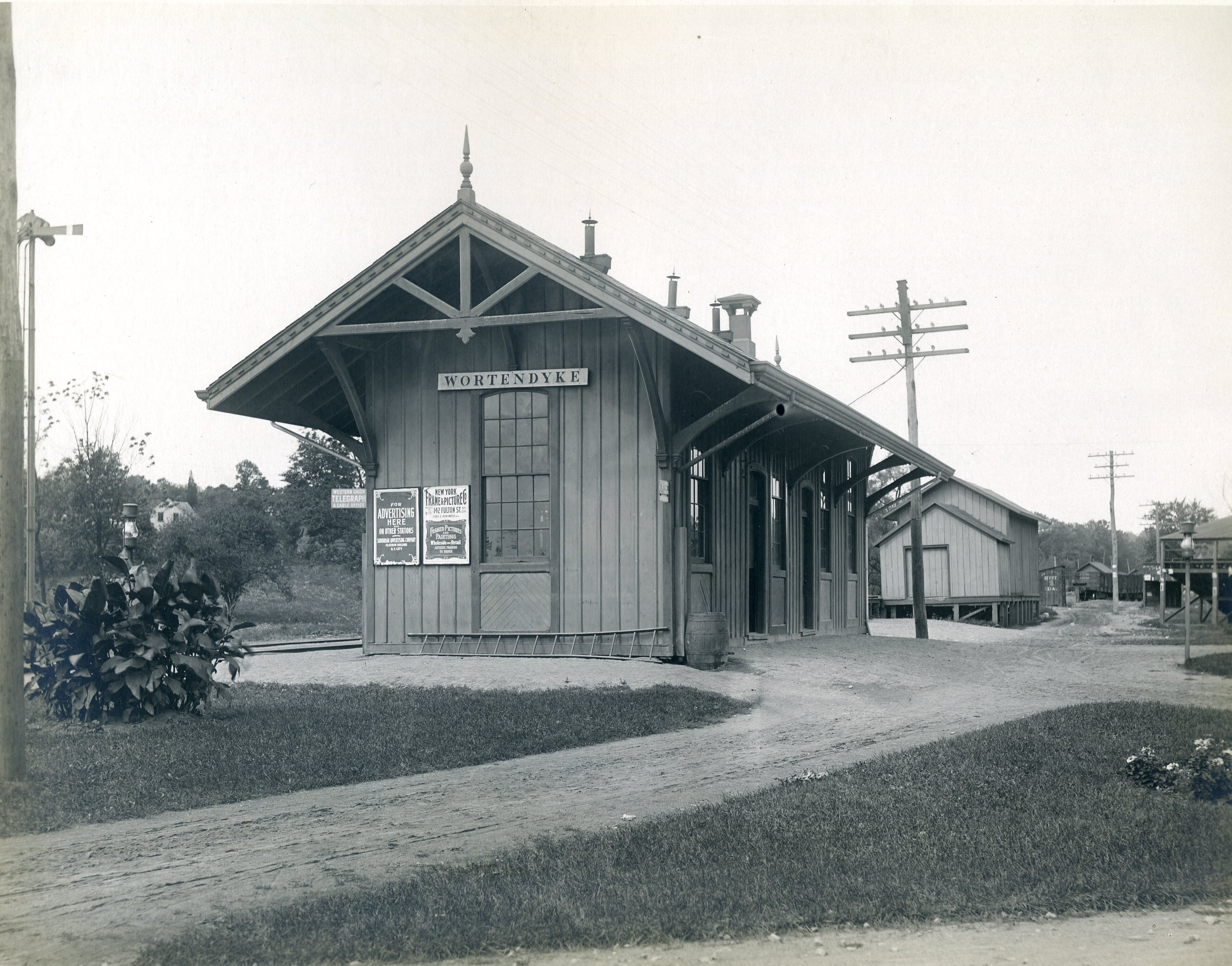
The station c. 1907–1912

== See also ==
Existing original station buildings from the New Jersey Midland can be found at Bogota, Vreeland Avenue, Butler, and Newfoundland among other places.

- NYSW (passenger 1939-1966) map
- Operating Passenger Railroad Stations Thematic Resource (New Jersey)

== Bibliography ==
- Catlin, George L. (1872). Homes on the Midland for New York Business Men. New York, New York: J. W. Pratt.
- Clayton, W. Woodford (1882). History of Bergen and Passaic Counties, New Jersey: With Biographical Sketches of Many of Its Pioneers and Prominent Men. Philadelphia, Pennsylvania: Everts & Peck.
- Mohowski, Robert E. (2003). The New York, Susquehanna & Western Railroad. Johns Hopkins University Press. ISBN 0-8018-7222-7.
- New Jersey State Legislature (1912). Documents of the One Hundred and Thirty Sixth Legislature of the State of New Jersey and the Sixty-Eighth Under the New Constitution: Vol. II Documents 5 to 16 Inclusive. Trenton, New Jersey: State Gazette Publishing Company.
- Carlough, Curtis V.; Fredericks, Harold; Stuy, Timothy; Van Dyk, Fred (1999). The Next Station Will Be... Volume 1 (Revised). New Jersey Midland Railroad Historical Society, Inc. ISBN 9780941652155.
