= Broadway–Paterson station =

Former railway station in Paterson, New Jersey, US

Broadway–Paterson
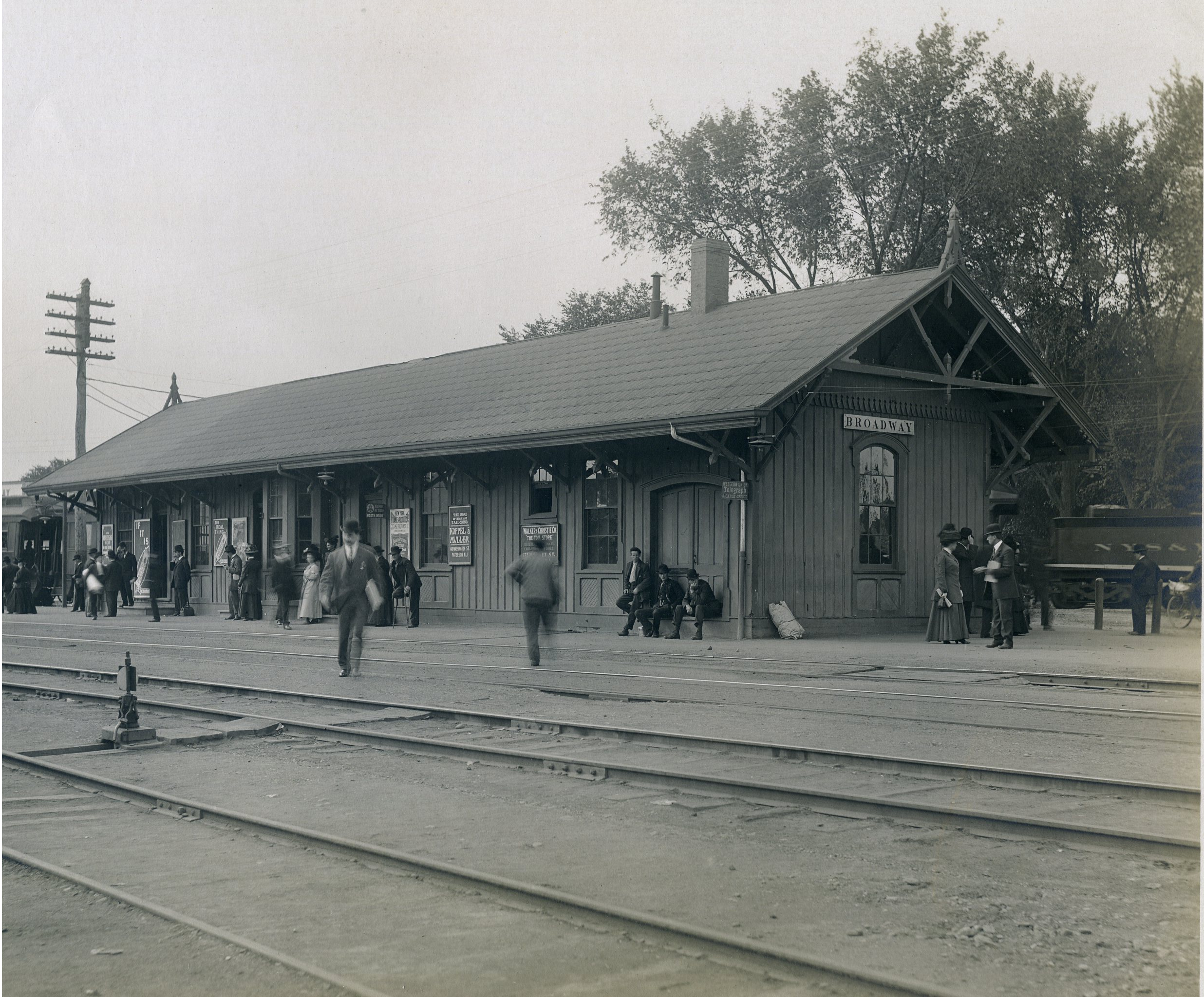
- Broadway station in November 1909.

General information
- Location: Madison Avenue at Ellison Place, Paterson, Passaic County, New Jersey 07501
- Coordinates: 40.917111°N 74.1553731°W
- Operator: New York, Susquehanna and Western Railroad
- Lines: Main Line; Paterson City Branch

Other information
- Station code: 1113 (Erie Railroad); RS (NYS&W)

History
- Opened: 1872; 154 years ago
- Closed: June 30, 1966; 60 years ago
- Electrified: Not electrified

Key dates
- April 13, 1982: Station depot caught fire
- April 14, 1982: Station depot demolished

Services
Preceding station	New York, Susquehanna and Western Railroad	Following station
Riverside toward Stroudsburg	Main Line	Vreeland Avenue toward Susquehanna Transfer or Jersey City
Paterson City Terminus	Paterson City Branch	Vreeland Avenue toward Susquehanna Transfer or Jersey City
Location

Broadway–Paterson was a New York, Susquehanna and Western Railroad (NYS&W) station in Paterson, New Jersey near the level, or at-grade crossing south of Broadway at Ellison Place and Madison Avenue. Service by the New Jersey Midland, a predecessor to the NYS&W, had begun in 1873. It was originally known as Paterson, but was renamed after a junction of the railroad's mainline was created to build the Paterson City Branch. The station house, demolished in 1982, was situated between the two lines and served as the Susquehanna's headquarters for several years. Passenger service on the branch ended in 1960 and on the mainline in 1966.

== Paterson City Branch ==
Begun in the 1881 as the Paterson Extension Railroad, the Paterson City Branch was a spur which diverged from what was then New Jersey Midland Railroad, and now the NWS&W main at line MP 20, at Madison Avenue and Ellison Place. It ran 0.74 miles (1.19 km) west to Straight Street in the immediate vicinity of what was the Erie Railroad's, and is now New Jersey Transit's, Main Line Paterson station. Passenger service was curtailed in 1926 from seven trains to one and stopped completely on January 1, 1927, after which the line was used only for freight.

Soon after the opening of the Susquehanna Transfer, the line was refurbished and passenger service was revived. The NYSW received spent $14,000 (1940 USD) to reconstruct the roadbed and $9,000 to build a new station to replace the old depot. Paterson City station re-opened on July 15, 1940, and was expanded twice by 1941. Service was eventually discontinued on January 9, 1960. The city bought the double track width right of way (ROW) (between Pearl and 16th streets) in 1960; there are few remnants.

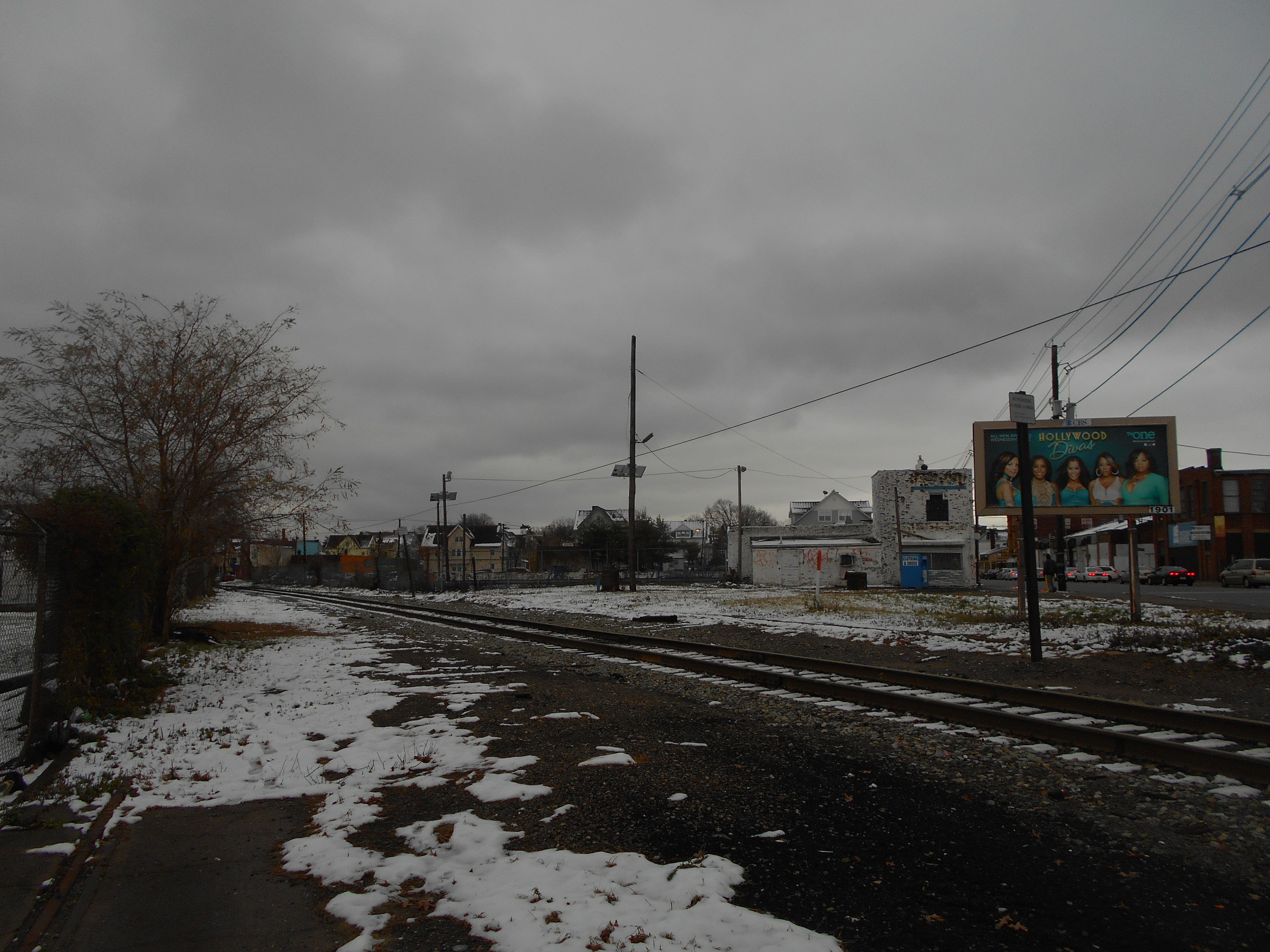
The ROW near station site in 2014

== Proposed Madison Avenue station ==
The Passaic–Bergen–Hudson Transit Project is a project by NJ Transit to possibly reintroduce passenger service on a portion of the NYSW right-of-way (ROW) in Passaic, Bergen and Hudson counties using newly built, FRA-compliant diesel multiple unit rail cars. A Madison Avenue station stop would be located southwest of the grade crossing between the intersections of Broadway with Madison Avenue and East 18th Street. It is one of several proposed for Paterson. Plans call for service to run from Hawthorne south through Paterson, east to Hackensack and then southeast to North Bergen, where it would join the Hudson-Bergen Light Rail (HBLR).

== See also ==
- Tram-train
- NYSW (passenger 1939–1966) map
- Passaic-Bergen-Hudson Transit map

== Bibliography ==
- Catlin, George L. (1872). Homes on the Midland for New York Business Men (Report). New York, New York: J. W. Pratt – via HathiTrust Digital Library.
- Mohowski, Robert E. (2003). The New York, Susquehanna and Western Railroad. Baltimore, Maryland: The Johns Hopkins University Press. ISBN 0801872227.
- Kaminski, Edward S. (November 22, 2010). New York, Susquehanna & Western Railroad in New Jersey. Mount Pleasant, South Carolina: Arcadia Publishing. ISBN 9780738573670.
- Carlough, Curtis V.; Fredericks, Harold; Stuy, Timothy; Van Dyk, Fred (1999). The Next Station Will Be... Volume 1 (Revised). New Jersey Midland Railroad Historical Society, Inc. ISBN 9780941652155.
