= New Jersey Midland Railway =

19th-century American railroad

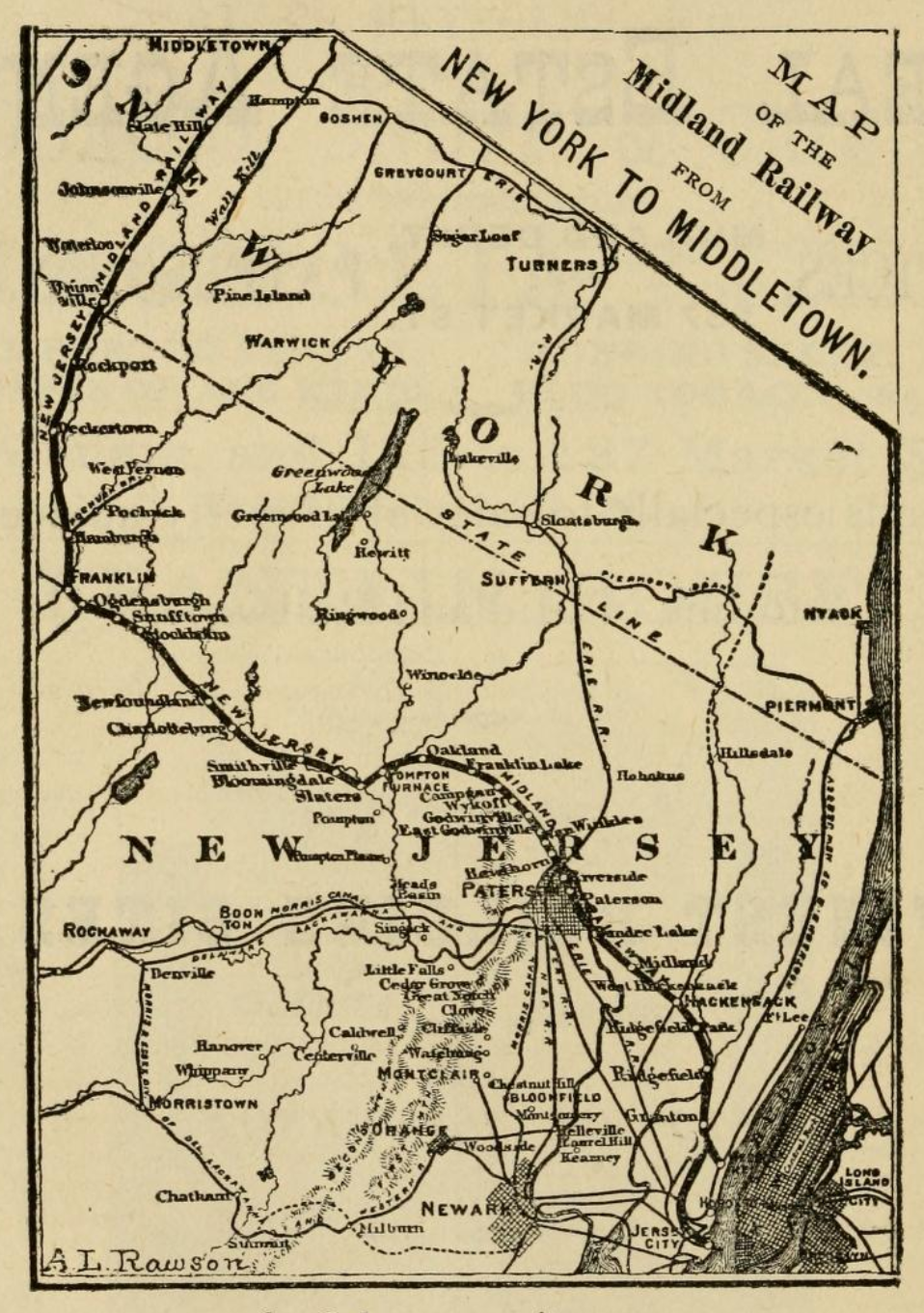
- The NJ Midland in 1872

Overview
- Key people: Cornelius Wortendyke, DeWitt Clinton Littlejohn
- Reporting mark: NJM
- Locale: New Jersey; New York, U.S.
- Dates of operation: 1870–1881
- Successor: New York, Susquehanna and Western Railway

Technical
- Track gauge: 4 ft 8 1/2 in (1,435 mm) standard gauge
- Length: 71 mi (114.26 km)

A map of the NJM along with later NYSW-added extensions to the west

The New Jersey Midland Railway, also known simply as "the Midland,” was a nineteenth century railroad in Northern New Jersey and Orange County, New York. It was the main predecessor to the modern day New York, Susquehanna and Western Railway (NYS&W).

== Formation and construction ==
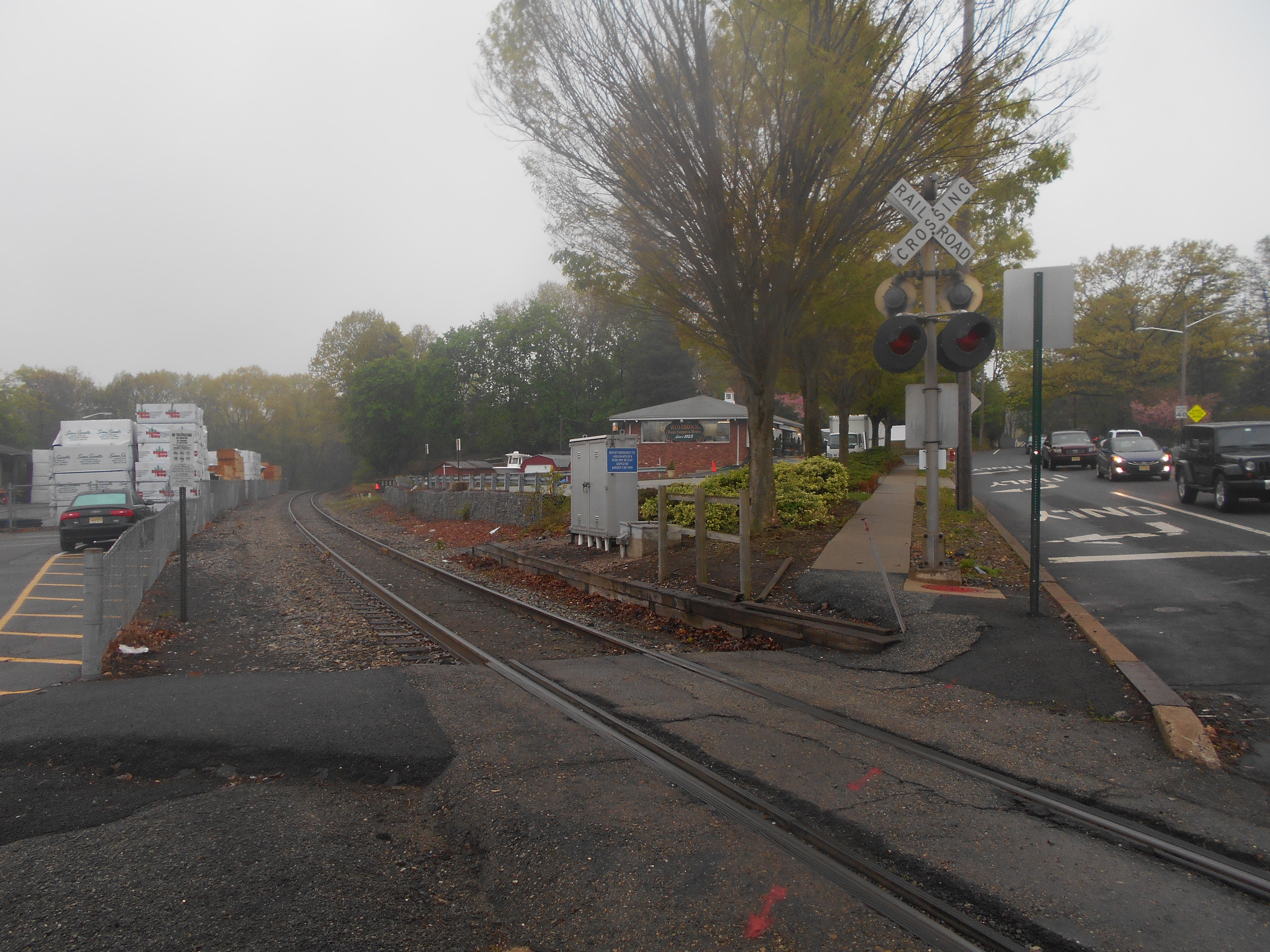
The right of way in Midland Park, named after the NJ Midland Railway

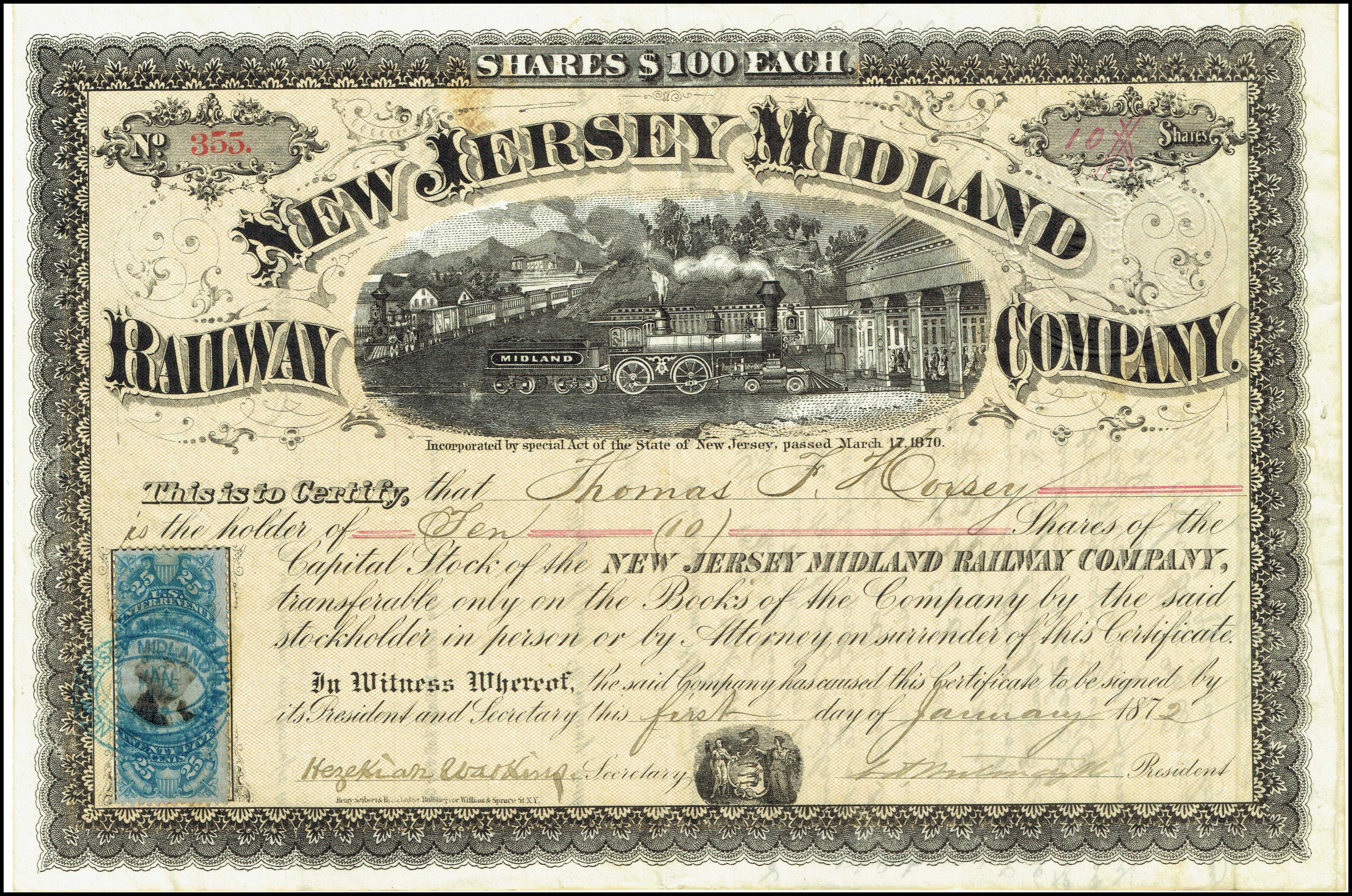
Share of the New Jersey Midland Railway Company, issued 1 January 1872

The New Jersey Midland Railway can trace its earliest roots back to 1828, when John Langdon Sullivan surveyed the first route across northern New Jersey with the intent of transporting Pennsylvania coal by rail to industrial Paterson, New Jersey. While New Jersey industry had supply of iron ore, it needed local sources of coal to smelt it following shortages of British coal after the War of 1812.

The Morris Canal had begun operation for this purpose by 1831, but was seasonal and slow; industry demanded better. The New Jersey, Hudson & Delaware Railroad (NJH&D) was chartered in March of 1832 as the fifth railroad in New Jersey; it was based on Sullivan's surveyed route. It would connect Paterson east to the ports along the Hudson Waterfront opposite New York City at Hoboken, and west to Pennsylvania at the Delaware Water Gap. Due to financial difficulties incurred during the Panic of 1837, the company did not construct anything until 1867, but its charter remained active. Further set back by the Panic of 1857, the railroad sold its charter to the Pennsylvania Coal Company.

By the mid-1860s, several companies were formed to create railroads across northern New Jersey. The earliest of these, the Hoboken, Ridgefield and Paterson Railroad (HR&P), was chartered in March of 1866 to connect Paterson with the ports along the Hudson River waterfront; various logistical issues ensured this company would not actually build anything. More successful was the New Jersey Western Railroad (NJW), chartered in 1867, which had built about ten miles of trackage from the vicinity of Hawthorne west to Bloomingdale. This attracted the attention of DeWitt Clinton Littlejohn, founder of the New York and Oswego Midland Railroad (NYOM) of Oswego, New York. He envisioned the New Jersey Western as a possible final eastern link from Lake Ontario to New York City for his railroad, as the NYOM had no charter itself to build in New Jersey.

To that end, the New Jersey Midland Railway (NJM) was formed in 1870 as a consolidation of the NJW, the NJH&D, the HR&P,^{[a]} and the Sussex Valley Railroad, "under the chartered rights, powers and privileges of the New Jersey, Hudson and Delaware Railroad Company." With the final barrier to the waterfront being the Hudson Palisades, the original plan included a cut through them near Englewood to run south along the river to Weehawken, but the company lacked the money to do so. It instead made arrangements to run through the Pennsylvania Railroad's cut from Marion Junction through Bergen Hill in Jersey City to their Exchange Place Terminal. By December 20, the first locomotive would run on the NJM; the 'Passaic' built by Rogers Locomotive and Machine Works in Paterson.

In 1871 the Midland built as far west as Butler, with the first train running on April 27. Later the railroad would reach Two Bridges/Beaver Lake through Sussex County, including construction of the Backwards Tunnel in December of 1871. The NJM would reach the New York state line at Hanford, New Jersey, just south of Unionville, New York, to meet with the Middletown, Unionville and Water Gap Railroad (MUWGRR). This new railroad made the Ogden Mine Railroad obsolete. The section of the railroad from Ogdensburg north was later known as the Hanford Branch once the "new" connection south toward the Delaware Water Gap was built beginning in the 1880s. The successor NYS&W would later abandon its Hanford Branch in 1958. The railroad would return to the area in 1986 with a shifted route to run along a parallel section of the former Lehigh and Hudson River Railway right-of-way between Sparta Junction and Campbell Hall, New York.

By 1872, the Midland line opened between Middletown, New York and Jersey City including trackage rights over the MUWGRR. It was marketed as a unified "Midland Railway" but also described as "The New Jersey Division of The New York Midland Railway." The first train ran May 1. The Midland also built a line through the Ridgefields by 1872, but with no station. It joined the Erie Railroad Northern Branch at Granton Junction near Babbitt, and reached the community of New Durham (near the point where the Susquehanna Transfer would later be located, now under New Jersey Route 495).

In September of 1873, the NYOM would lease the NJM, but this was shortly undone by the Panic of 1873. This resulted in the NYOM falling into financial trouble and the NJM taking ownership of the line from Jersey City to Middletown in November.

== Bankruptcy and formation of the NYS&W ==
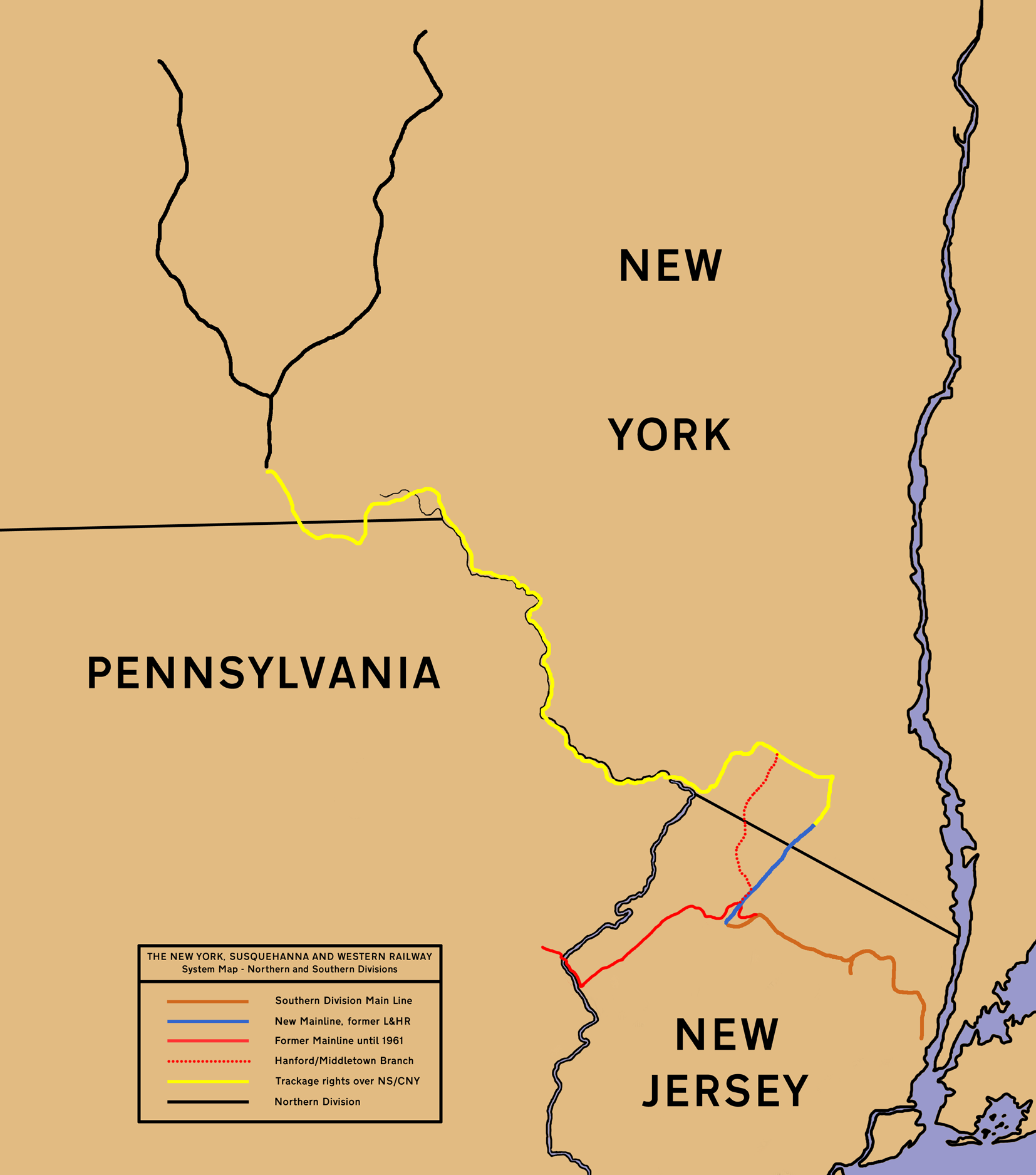
A map of the New York, Susquehanna and Western Railway, the most recent successor of the Midland Railway

In March of 1875, the Midland fell into receivership with James McCulloh and Garret Hobart appointed as receivers. By December 1878, a dispute broke out between various bondholders, some of whom disputed that the Hudson Connecting Railway should be included in the proceedings.

By 1879 the receivers had declared their intent to put the railroad up for sale, and the Midland was listed as such on September 14. On February 21, 1880, the NJ Midland, along with the Hudson Connecting Railway, was sold to Charles Parsons, who represented the bondholders of the first and second mortgages, at a price of $2.5 Million; the two railroads were combined into one. On May 15, 1880, the "property of the defunct New Jersey Midland Railway Company was delivered to the Midland Railroad Company of New Jersey."

In April of 1881 construction began on the Paterson Extension Railroad, later the Paterson City branch. Survey work also began on the line from Ogdensburg south to the Water Gap. Later in 1881, the Midland started the New York and Scranton Construction Company to begin building towards the coal fields of the Wyoming Valley of Pennsylvania. with the Pennsylvania Midland Railroad chartered in that state in May of 1881. The Midland also started up several more corporations to further its goals and plans were made to form another new railroad consolidating all of these.

On June 10, 1881 the NJ Midland was consolidated with the MUWGRR, the Paterson Extension Railroad, the Midland Connecting Railroad, the North Jersey Railroad, the Water Gap Railroad and the Pennsylvania Midland to form the New York, Susquehanna and Western Railway (NYS&W) with Frederic A. Potts as railroad president.

The new company then expanded west into Pennsylvania, fulfulling the original desires of the NJH&D charter to haul coal. For that purpose a new railroad, the Wilkes-Barre and Eastern Railroad, was eventually chartered by the NYS&W on March 18, 1892 in an attempt to keep the parent company secret.

== Stations and possible future use ==
Susquehanna commuter service ended in 1966, but was considered for restoration in the 2010s as the part of the Passaic–Bergen–Hudson Transit Project, a project by NJ Transit possibly reintroducing passenger service on a portion of the NYSW right-of-way (ROW) in Passaic, Bergen and Hudson counties. The service was to use newly built, FRA-compliant diesel multiple unit rail cars (with stations at Vreeland Avenue and Vince Lombardi Park and Ride, among others.

Existing original station buildings from the NJ Midland era can be found at Bogota, Maywood, Rochelle Park, Wortendyke, Butler, and Newfoundland among other places.

== Constituent Railroads ==
=== New Jersey, Hudson and Delaware ===
Chartered in 1832 with original members Jacob M. Ryerson, Samuel Fowler, Thomas C. Ryerson, Joseph E. Edsall, James Stoll, John Bell, William Dickey, William Heyberger, James M. Porter, John Hagerty, John Moore, and Daniel M. Brodhead listed. The charter authorized the railroad to build from the Delaware River to Snufftown to the Hudson River. An 1842 extension to the charter due to the Panic of 1837 let the work be delayed for a decade.

On December 30, 1853, the charter was transferred to the Pennsylvania Coal Company. That company began making arrangements to build the railroad but was stymied by the Panic of 1857. This led to the charter being bought back by the reorganized original charter holders, who purchased it back in January of 1867. The new Board of Directors included John Rutherford (president), Martin John Ryerson (secretary), Julius H. Pratt, Delos E. Culver, Albert Pearce, Martin John Ryerson, H. C. Spalding, DeWitt Clinton Littlejohn, Henry R. Lowe, and James Lomes. The group's goal was to bring coal "from the Pennsylvania coal fields to tidewater" via Paterson, New Jersey in order to get a lower price per ton than the Morris Canal.

=== Hoboken, Ridgefield and Paterson ===
On March 15, 1866, The New Jersey Legislature passed an act incorporating the HR&P to build a line from Hoboken to Paterson, bypassing Hackensack. Delays led to the charter being extended five years in 1868, and a provision was added in 1869 allowing the route into Hackensack. "Corporators" were listed as Philip Rafferty, Benjamin Buckley, William Gledhill, William S. Banta, W.W. Shippen, Peter Townsend, David Crawford, Edward K. Al Burtis, Daniel W. Talcott, Benjamin K Hutton, and Edward M. Clymer.

=== Sussex Valley Railroad Company ===
The Sussex Valley Railroad was organized by Samuel Whitaker, John Loomis, Simeon McCoy, A. Kendall, James W. McCoy, Jonathan S. DeWitt, John E. Adams, Mordecai Wilson, Jr., Lebius Martin, Lewis Dunn, William Owen, Jacob Martin, Marshall

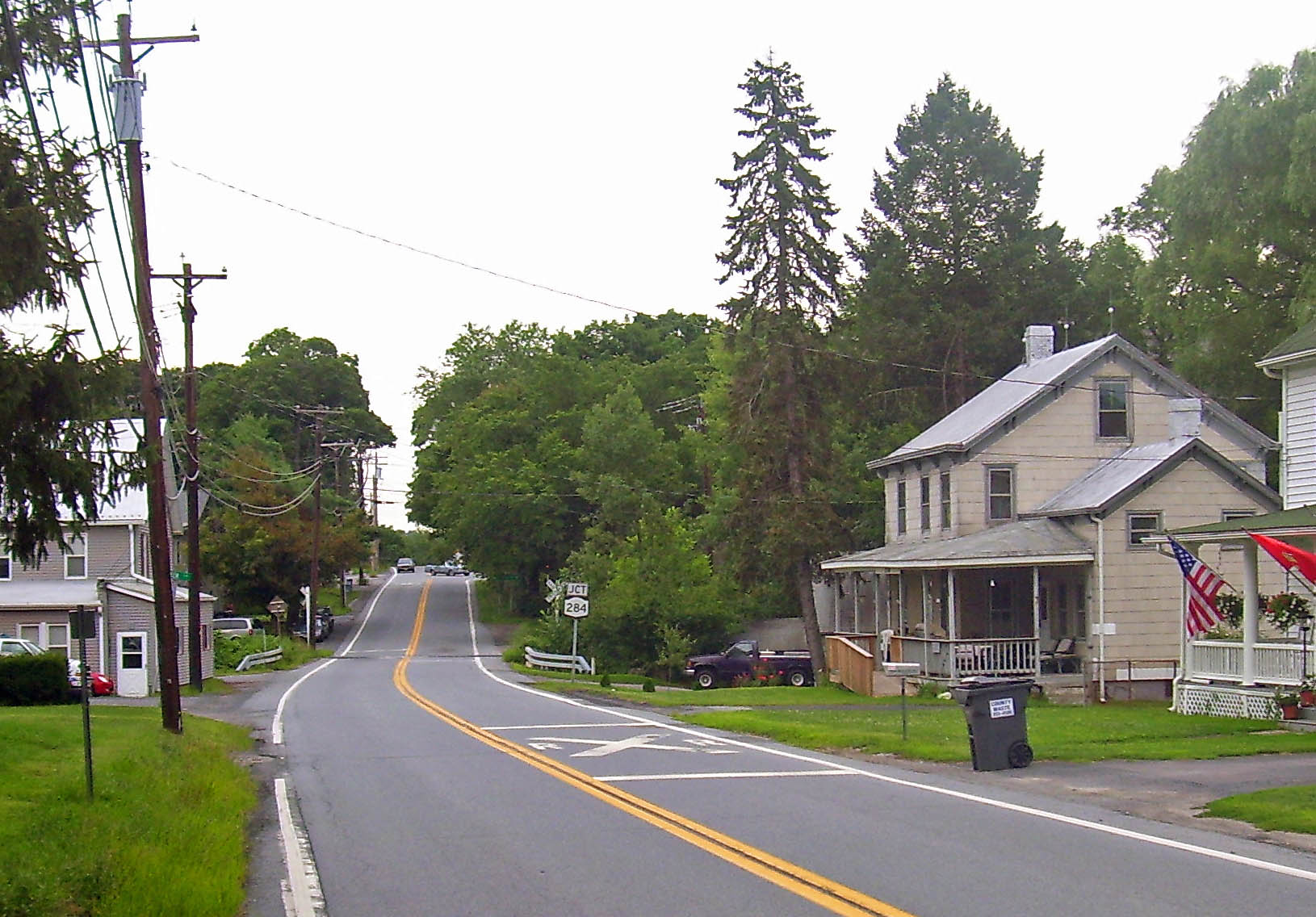
Grade crossing at Slate Hill, New York on the MUWGRR, used by the MNJ since 1947

Hunt, Isaac Wildrock, Aaron Keyser, and Aaron O. Bartow. The charter was authorized on March 14, 1867 to build from "some suitable point in the County of Sussex" to Deckertown (now Sussex), with the right to extend the line through Sussex and Warren Counties to Columbia, New Jersey on the Delaware River.

=== New Jersey Western Railroad Company ===
The NJW was chartered a week after the Sussex Valley, on March 21, 1867 by Cornelius A. Wortendyke, Isaac Demarest, Adam Boyd, Aaron G. Garrison, John V. Beam, Charles F. Johnson, Samuel Pope, John Hopper, and Danel Blauvelt. The route was to go from Franklin in Bergen County to the Passaic/Sussex County line. By 1869, the route had been planned to run from the Erie railroad junction at (now) Hawthorne, through Godwinville (now Wortendyke), Wyckoff, Pompton, and Bloomingdale.

=== Middletown, Unionville and Water Gap Railroad ===
In 1866, public meetings were held in Middletown, Westtown and Unionville, New York to discuss the viability of a railroad via these hamlets to Deckertown, Sussex County, New Jersey. A route was surveyed from there to Middletown, but, as built, the Middletown, Unionville and Water Gap Railroad only extended from a connection with the NY&E in Middletown to Unionville, which was reached on December 6, 1867, after fourteen months of construction. Freight cars received from the Erie made the 14-mile (23 km) trip to Unionville starting January 13, 1868. The MUWGRR was built to the 6-foot (1.8 m) broad gauge of the Erie. A third rail allowed for use of the NJM's standard-gauge cars on the line. The road was leased to the Erie and commenced regular operations as the Erie's "Unionville Branch" on May 15, 1868.

The New York and Oswego Midland Railroad (NYOM) — incorporated January 11, 1866 with the goal of linking Oswego, New York, on Lake Ontario, with the Hudson River at a point across from New York City — reached Middletown in 1871. It was hoped it would connect with three New Jersey companies to form a through route to the Port of New York and New Jersey. The link between the NYOM and the NJM became the MUWGRR, which was leased by the NYOM effective April 1, 1872.

In 1911, the MUWGRR defaulted on its second mortgage bonds. A former vice president of the Erie, which was leasing the MUWGRR, opened a foreclosure suit in New York Supreme Court. In 1913, it reemerged as the Middletown & Unionville; this was sold at foreclosure on January 15, 1947 and reorganized as the Middletown & New Jersey .

Today, the Middletown and New Jersey Railroad uses the line formerly known as the MUWGRR.

=== Hudson Connecting Railway ===
A charter for the Hudson Connecting Railway Company had been in existence since April 1, 1869. By November 1872 the Midland had circumvented its charter's restrictions on at-grade crossings at a diamond. It built a trestle over the Erie yards to connect with the New Jersey Rail Road and Transportation Company (PRR) at what would be called West End Junction in the Marion section of Jersey City. The Erie Railroad opposed the NJM's crossing of its right-of-way and fought it in the courts. As a result of the reorganization of the Midland Railway into the Midland Railroad in 1880, the Hudson Connecting Railway became part of the NYS&W.

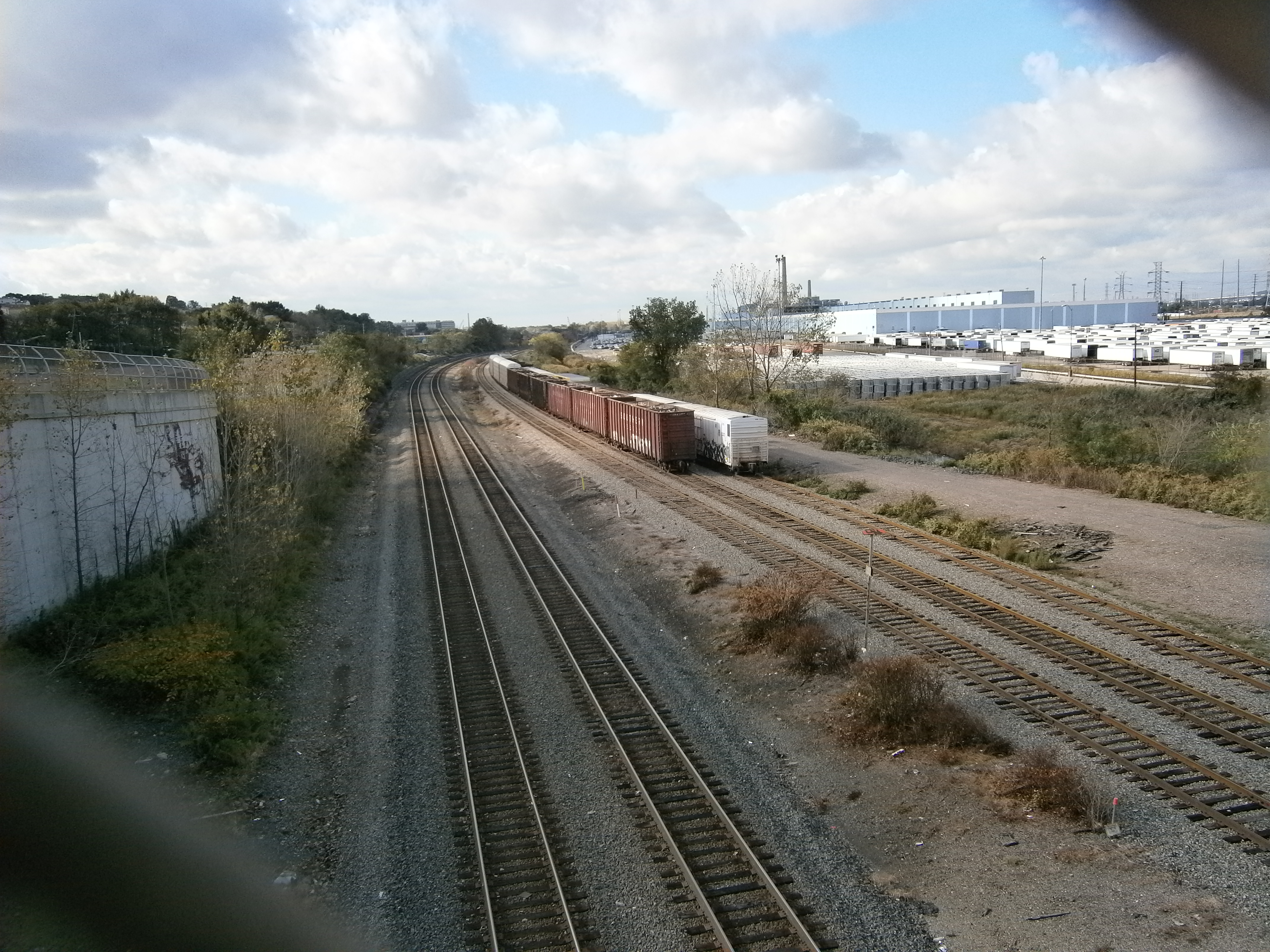
The right-of-way of the Hudson Connecting in Jersey City, now part of NYS&W (at right), runs parallel to the Northern Branch

== Notes ==
^{a} In 1867 the NJH&D would perform some minimal grading in Butler and Bloomingdale to preserve its charter by at least doing some work. "I saw them go over there and dig the snow with shovels to save the charter." - A. Zabriskie Ryerson

== See also ==
- NYSW (passenger 1939-1966) map
- Timeline of Jersey City area railroads
- Northern Branch
- North Bergen Yard
- Ridgefield Park (NYCRR/NYS&W station)
- Hackensack station (New York, Susquehanna and Western Railroad)

== Bibliography ==
- Catlin, George L. (1872). Homes on the Midland for New York Business Men. New York, New York: J. W. Pratt.
- Lucas, Walter Arndt (1980) [1939]. The History of the New York, Susquehanna and Western Railroad (second ed.). Railroadians of America. LCCN 82163920.
- Karlewicz, Ken; Hartley, Scott (1987). Susquehanna: From Shortlines to Stackpacks. Piscataway, New Jersey: Railpace Company, Inc. LCCN 87020698.
- Krause, John; Crist, Ed (1991). Susquehanna: New York, Susquehanna & Western RR. Newton, New Jersey: Carstens Publications. ISBN 9780911868807.
- Mohowski, Robert E. (2003). The New York, Susquehanna & Western Railroad. Baltimore: Johns Hopkins University Press. ISBN 9780801872228.
- Schmitt, James C. (2009). Historic Rails of the New York, Susquehanna & Western Railroad. West Milford, New Jersey: Tinfoil Rose Design, LLC. ISBN 9780615313849.
