= Butler station (New York, Susquehanna and Western Railway) =

Butler
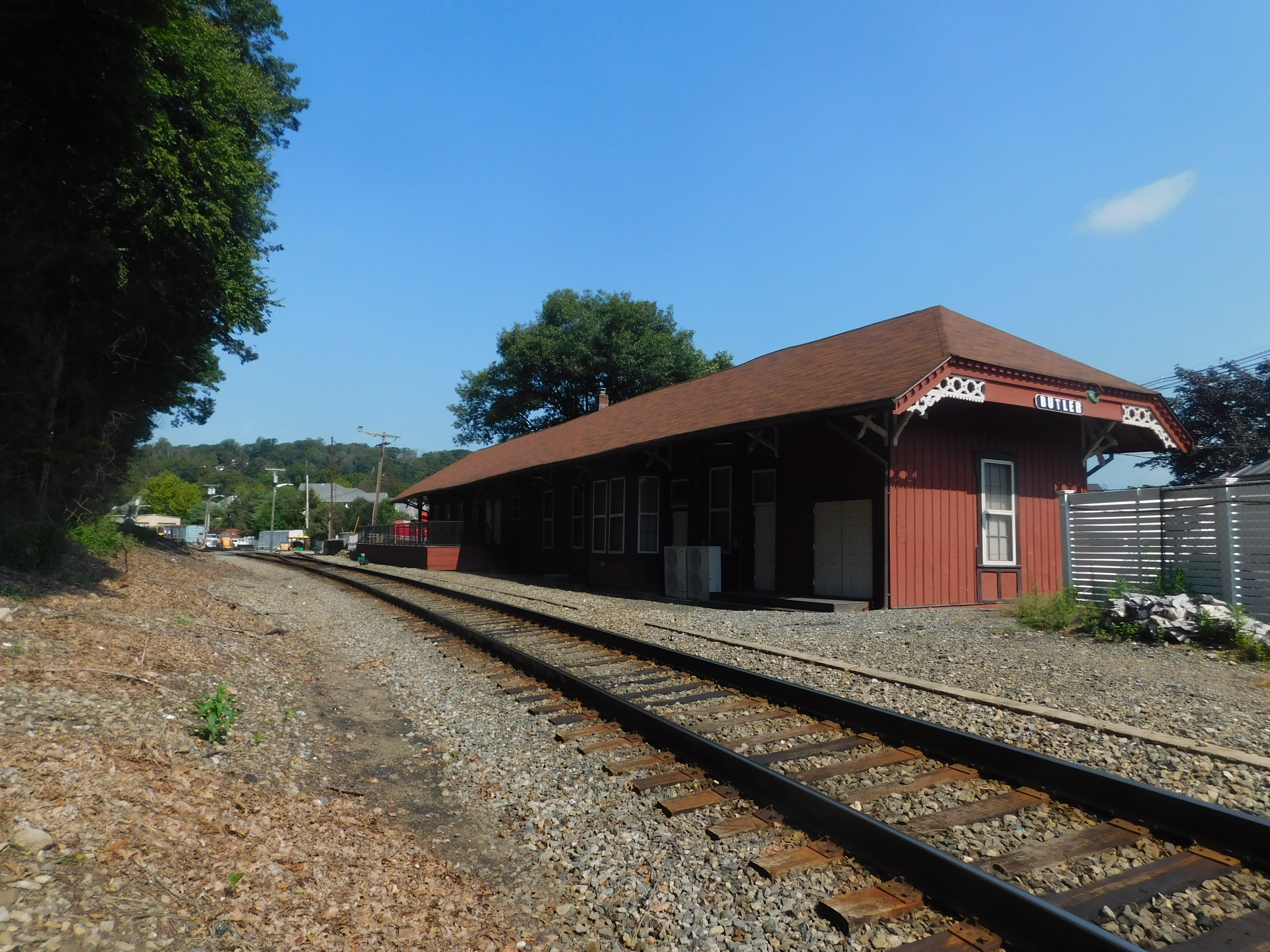
- Butler station in August 2025

General information
- Location: 221 Main Street, Butler, New Jersey 07405
- Owner: New York, Susquehanna and Western Railroad
- Line: New York, Susquehanna and Western Railroad
- Platforms: 1 side platform
- Tracks: 2 NYS&W

Other information
- Station code: 1149 (Erie Railroad); BA (NYS&W)

History
- Opened: May 1, 1872
- Closed: June 30, 1966
- Rebuilt: 1888
- Electrified: Not electrified
- Former names: West Bloomingdale (1872–)

Services
Preceding station	New York, Susquehanna and Western Railroad	Following station
Charlotteburgh toward Stroudsburg	Main Line	Bloomingdale toward Susquehanna Transfer or Jersey City
- New York Susquehanna & Western Railroad Station
- U.S. National Register of Historic Places
- New Jersey Register of Historic Places
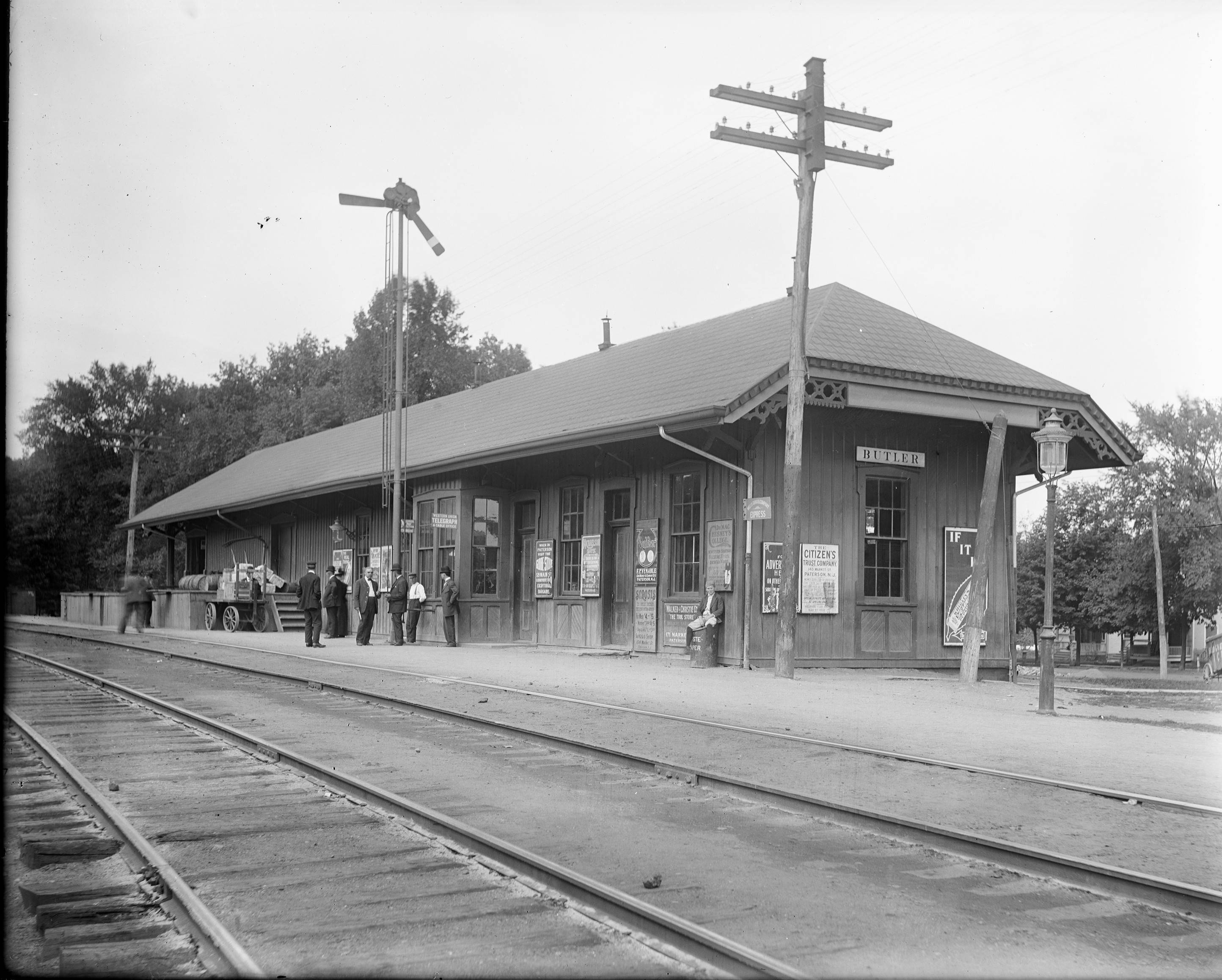
- Official Erie Railroad photo of Butler station c. 1907–1912

- Location within Morris County, New Jersey Location within New Jersey Location within the United States
- Location: Main Street, Butler, New Jersey
- Coordinates: 41°0′14″N 74°20′33″W
- Area: 1.2 acres (0.49 ha)
- Built: 1872
- Architectural style: Stick/Eastlake
- NRHP reference No.: 01001492
- NJRHP No.: 2093

Significant dates
- Added to NRHP: January 24, 2002
- Designated NJRHP: August 15, 2001
Location

Butler is a former commuter railroad train station in the borough of Butler, Morris County, New Jersey. Serving passenger and freight trains of the New York, Susquehanna and Western Railway, Butler served as the western terminus of service beginning in 1941, when passenger service was cut from Stroudsburg, Pennsylvania. Trains from Butler operated to Pavonia Terminal in Jersey City until December 12, 1958 and then Susquehanna Transfer in North Bergen until the discontinuation of service on June 30, 1966. Butler station consisted of a single low-level side platform with the wooden frame station. The next station east was Bloomingdale.

Railroad service through Butler began on May 1, 1872 with the opening of the New Jersey Midland Railroad from Pompton Township to Middletown, New York. However, the station at the time was known as West Bloomingdale. The station depot, built in Stick–Eastlake architecture in 1888, currently serves as the Butler Museum, a local nonprofit historical entity. The National Register of Historic Places added Butler station to its listings on January 24, 2002 for its transportation significance. Since May 1976, the station has served as the Butler Museum, a local museum focusing on the industrial, cultural and social histories of the municipality.

== History ==
As part of a $125,000 deal to acquire some right-of-way along Main Street in Butler, the municipality acquired the station depot. This deal helped facilitate plans for a widening of Main Street and relocate the main line tracks for the Susquehanna. The municipality spent money to repair the depot's leaking roof and volunteers from Butler High School helped clean the depot. The new museum opened to the public on May 8, 1976 with a bicentennial parade on Main Street and dedication speeches.

== See also ==
- NYSW (passenger 1939–1966) map
- Operating Passenger Railroad Stations Thematic Resource (New Jersey)
- National Register of Historic Places listings in Morris County, New Jersey
- List of museums in New Jersey

== Bibliography ==
- Catlin, George L. (1872). Homes on the Midland for New York Business Men. New York, New York: J. W. Pratt.
- Mohowski, Robert E. (2003). The New York, Susquehanna & Western Railroad. Johns Hopkins University Press. ISBN 0-8018-7222-7.
- Carlough, Curtis V.; Fredericks, Harold; Stuy, Timothy; Van Dyk, Fred (1999). The Next Station Will Be... Volume 1 (Revised). New Jersey Midland Railroad Historical Society, Inc. ISBN 9780941652155.
