= Susquehanna Transfer =

Railway station in New Jersey, United States

Coordinates: 40.7763°N 74.0419°W

SUSQUEHANNA TRANSFER
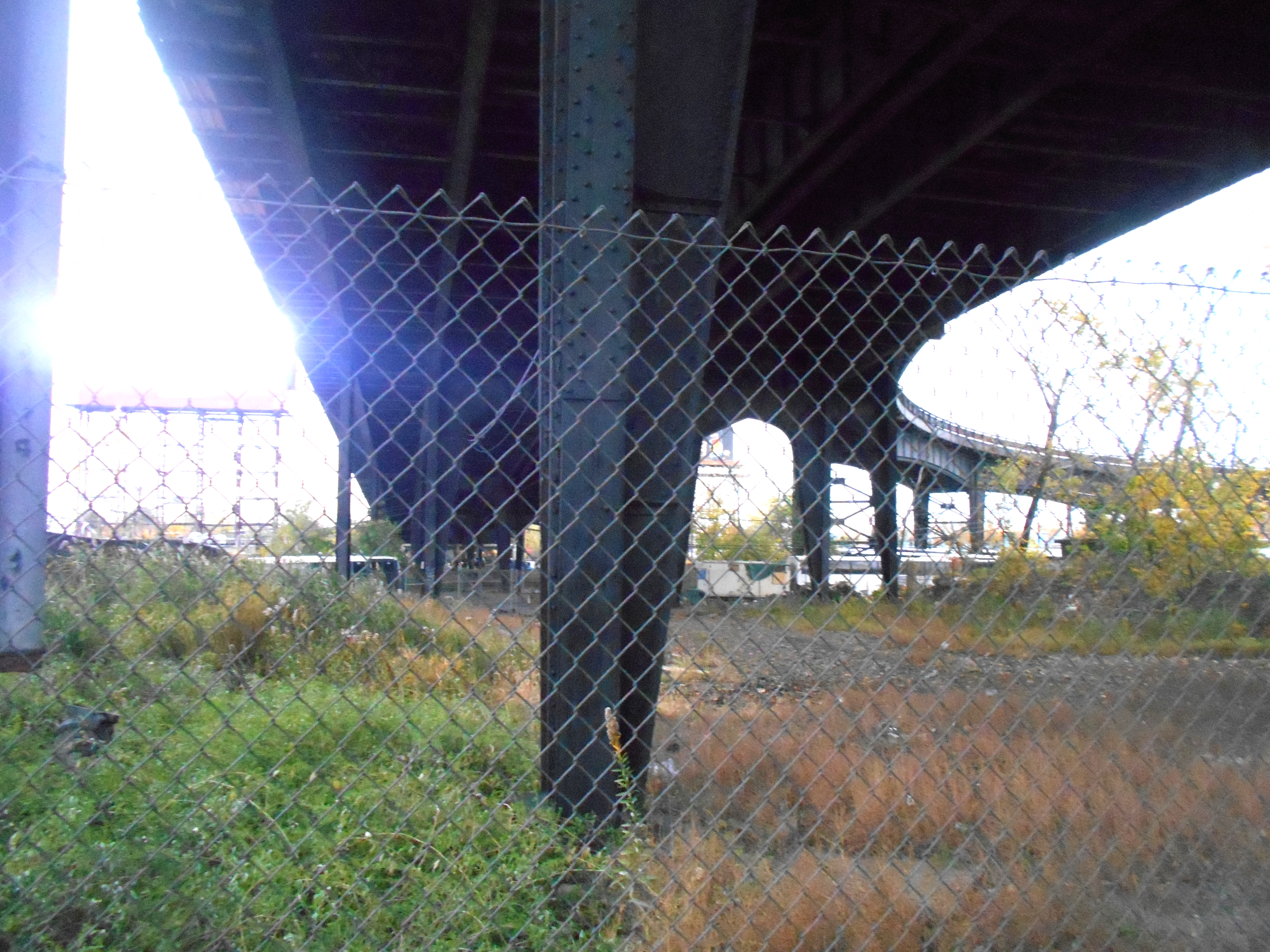
- The former Susquehanna Transfer station site in 2014. Route 495 is overhead.

General information
- Location: Route 3 at Tonnelle Avenue (U.S. Route 1/9), North Bergen, Hudson County, New Jersey 07047
- Owner: New York, Susquehanna and Western Railroad
- Lines: New York, Susquehanna and Western Railroad; Northern Branch (Erie Railroad)
- Platforms: 1 island platform
- Tracks: 2 NYS&W, 1 Northern Branch

History
- Opened: August 1, 1939 (NYS&W); September 25, 1939 (Erie Railroad)
- Closed: 1966
- Electrified: Not electrified

Services
Preceding station	Erie Railroad	Following station
North Bergen toward Nyack	Northern Branch	Jersey City Terminus
Preceding station	New York, Susquehanna and Western Railroad	Following station
North Bergen toward Stroudsburg	Main Line	Jersey City Terminus
Location

Susquehanna Transfer was a passenger station on the New York, Susquehanna and Western Railway, located in North Bergen, New Jersey located at what today is the Route 495 overpass. It was an interchange station where transfer was possible from the railroad to a bus through the Lincoln Tunnel to the Port Authority Bus Terminal in Midtown Manhattan.

The station opened on August 1, 1939, 1,100 feet (340 m) south of the old North Bergen station. At the time, the company was in bankruptcy proceedings, as part of the also bankrupt Erie Railroad. The buses were leased from the Public Service Bus Company and were open only to NYS&W passengers transferring to them. The bus fare was 15 cents. The buses allowed commuters to go directly to Midtown Manhattan, rather than taking the train to the Pavonia Terminal over the Erie Railroad's tracks and then taking an Erie RR ferry across to Lower Manhattan.

The Erie Railroad also used the transfer station for trains on its Northern Branch, at least through 1957, with an agreement with the NYS&W to use their buses in 1944.

Connecting train / bus service at the site ended in 1966.

The former transfer station is now the site of NJ Transit's North Bergen Park & Ride with bus service on the NJ Transit 320 bus route to Port Authority Bus Terminal.

== History ==
=== Construction ===
Walter Kidde, who was the trustee-in-bankruptcy for the New York, Susquehanna and Western Railroad after filing for bankruptcy reorganization in 1937, noticed that most commuter traffic was heading to Midtown Manhattan, and that the major railroads in the area had or little or no service to Midtown. The Lincoln Tunnel had been completed in 1937, and Kidde offered the idea that it might be faster for commuters to head to Midtown by connecting with bus companies that used State Highway Route S-3. A couple years later, Railway Age noted that it was common for passengers from the north arriving at the Erie Railroad's Pavonia Ferry terminal at Chambers Street to head back north again since their ultimate destination was Midtown Manhattan. This new connection would save time for commuters heading from Paterson, Hackensack and Butler to Times Square or elsewhere in Midtown.

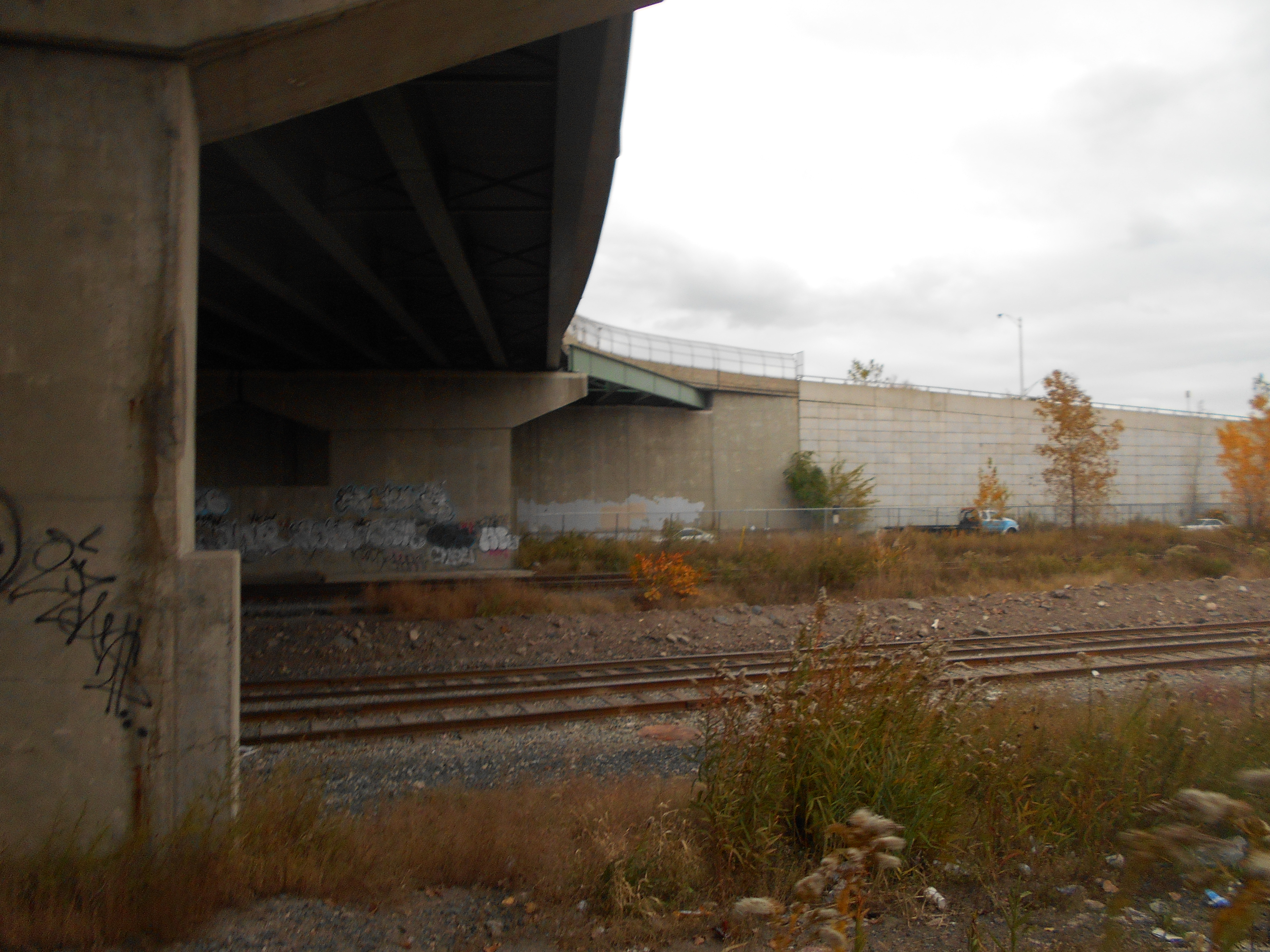
North Bergen station site in October 2014. Paterson Plank Road appears overhead. North Bergen station was the originally proposed location of the new transfer station

However, the idea immediately met opposition by bus companies and the Hudson and Manhattan Railroad when the Susquehanna proposed this new service in 1938. The Interstate Commerce Commission held hearings during 1938 and 1939 and in May 1939, which fell in favor of the Susquehanna. During this time period, Kidde had proposed bustituting (replacing rail with bus) between North Hawthorne and Butler, but this was torpedoed by neighborhoods opposing the change, such as Pompton Lakes as well as a jump in ridership.

Kidde decided to develop a new plan for the transfer station. The first part was construction of Susquehanna Transfer, a station in North Bergen, where it would meet with Route S-3, 2 miles (3.2 km) west of the tunnel. The original proposal that Kidde offered was to remodel the former North Bergen station 1,100 feet (340 m) to the north and if successful, would be moved southward. However, the difference in cost between remodeling the North Bergen station and constructing a brand new station was small. The new station could include a platform for commuters to transfer directly from railroad cars to buses for the trip to Times Square at 42nd Street and Seventh Avenue.

In July 1939, of the five companies that applied for the service, the Public Service Interstate Transportation Company was selected to run the bus routes. The buses left at fixed times, and the Susquehanna adjusted the train schedule to connect with the buses. The station facility was finished before the end of the month and on July 31, as a soft opening, morning train No. 924 ran from Butler to Susquehanna Transfer, and that evening, train No. 919 returned to Butler. The next day, the station fully opened to the public, with 65 passengers using the transfer station. With ridership quickly increasing, the Erie Railroad added service to the transfer station on their Northern Branch on September 25.

=== Promotion ===
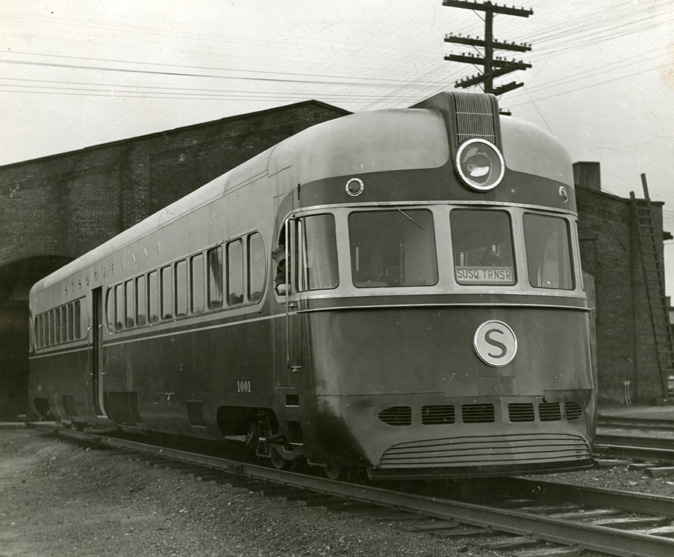
New York, Susquehanna and Western Railway streamlined Motorailer, Susquehanna Transfer, ca. 1940

In opening Susquehanna Transfer, Kidde's work became a heavy promotion point for Susquehanna independence from the Erie Railroad. On September 25, 1939, the Erie Railroad added two special trains to their schedule for midday service, the Noontimer and the Matinee Special. The increase in service also benefited the Susquehanna financially, showing the railroad made 2.34% in October 1939 than it did in October 1938. Public Service also did their part, advertising the Susquehanna service heavily with wall maps and pictures in Times Square.

The railroad also decided to reconstruct the former Paterson City Branch, which had been without passenger service since 1926. The Susquehanna received permission to spend $14,000 (1940 USD) to reconstruct the roadbed and an extra $9,000 to build a brand new station to replace the old brick depot. The Susquehanna almost sold off the rights of the branch to the city of Paterson, but instead was reconstructing it for railroad service. The Paterson City station re-opened on July 15, 1940 and was quickly required to be expanded twice by 1941.

In order to make service suitable, the new service would require the best new equipment. The Susquehanna was still using steam locomotives and Kidde felt it would require upgrading service. The use of steam locomotives still required turning engines at various Susquehanna facilities, including Butler, Pavonia Terminal, etc. Kidde wanted new equipment from France for the service that he saw at the 1939 World's Fair. This new equipment would be able to go 60 miles per hour (97 km/h) and hold at least 78 passengers. This would get people from Paterson City to Susquehanna Transfer in as low as 20 minutes dependent on stops. A test of equipment in 1939 resulted in a Butler to Pavonia Terminal time of 44 minutes, and a run from Broadway–Paterson station to Susquehanna Transfer in 17 minutes.

On October 7, 1939, Kidde announced that new railcars had been ordered from the American Car and Foundry Company with expectation that service would be running by May 1940. This new car, called the "Motorailer" or "Model 60", was lighter and had a manual transmission. The cars had a 290-horsepower engine and after construction of the new cars, they were tested on June 6, 1940 and just three weeks later, Kidde and Burton K. Wheeler as well as other dignitaries ran the new Motorailers from Times Square to Beaver Lake.

On July 1, 1940, Kidde announced that bus fare was reduced to 10 cents, made possible by increased usage by commuters.

== See also ==
- Manhattan Transfer station

== Bibliography ==
- Mohowski, Robert E. (2003). The New York, Susquehanna and Western Railroad. Baltimore, Maryland: The Johns Hopkins University Press. ISBN 0801872227.
