= Pavonia Terminal =

Former intermodal terminal in Jersey City, New Jersey

Coordinates: 40.726676°N 74.034757°W

Jersey City
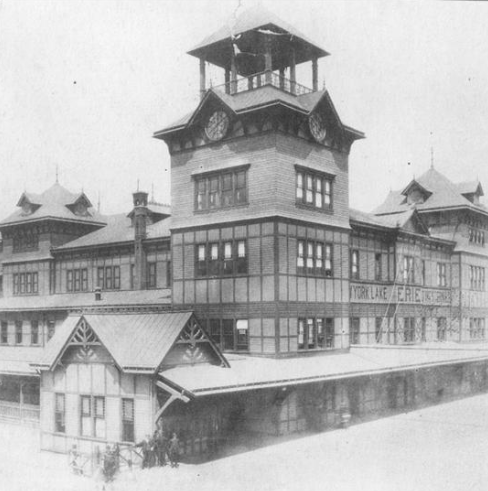

General information
- Location: Harsimus Cove, Jersey City, New Jersey, U.S.
- Owner: Erie Railroad
- Lines: Erie Railroad Main Line; New York, Susquehanna and Western Railroad; Bergen County Railroad; New York and Greenwood Lake Railroad; New Jersey and New York Railroad; Weehawken Branch; Newark Branch; Northern Branch
- Connections: Erie station (Hudson Tubes)

Other information
- Station code: 4971

History
- Opened: May 1, 1861
- Closed: December 12, 1958

Former services
Preceding station	Erie Railroad	Following station
Terminus	Pavonia Ferry	Chambers Street Terminus
Terminus	Pavonia Ferry	23rd Street Terminus
Rutherford toward Chicago	Main Line	Terminus
Rutherford toward Ridgewood	Bergen County Railroad	Terminus
Arlington toward Sterling Forest	New York and Greenwood Lake Railway	Terminus
Carlstadt toward Haverstraw	New Jersey and New York Railroad	Terminus
Susquehanna Transfer toward Nyack	Northern Branch	Terminus
Weehawken Terminus	Weehawken Branch	Terminus
Harrison toward Paterson	Newark Branch	Terminus
Preceding station	New York, Susquehanna and Western Railroad	Following station
Susquehanna Transfer toward Stroudsburg	Main Line	Terminus
Location

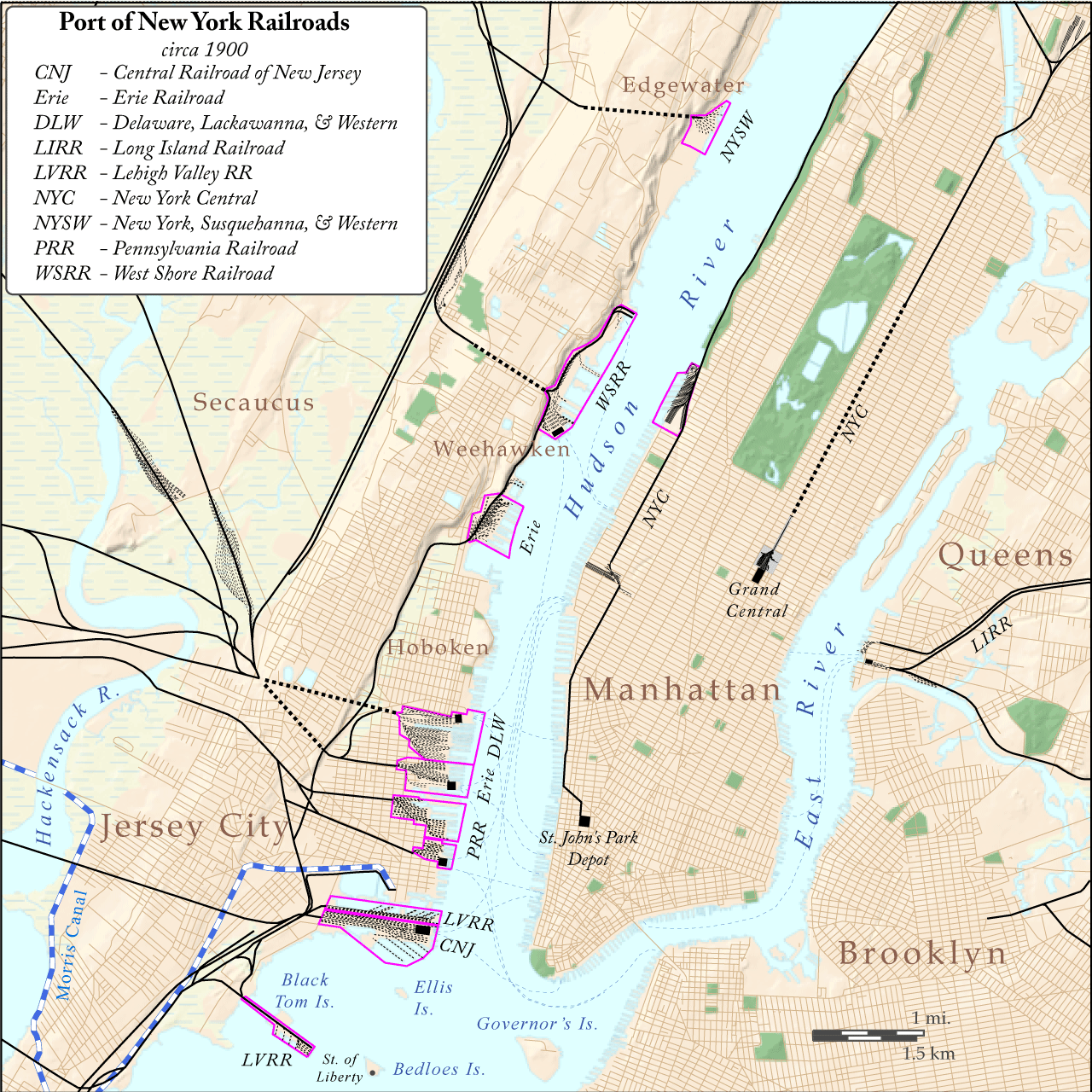
Map of the five train-to-ferry transfer points along the west shore of the Hudson River circa 1900

Pavonia Terminal was the Erie Railroad terminal on the Hudson River located in the Harsimus section of Jersey City, New Jersey. The station opened in 1861 and closed in 1958 when the Erie Railroad moved its passenger services to nearby Hoboken Terminal. The New York, Susquehanna and Western Railway also ran commuter trains from the terminal and various street cars, ferries and the underground Hudson and Manhattan Railroad serviced the station. The station was abandoned in 1958 and demolished in 1961. The site was eventually redeveloped into the Newport district in the late 20th century.

Pavonia was one of five passenger railroad terminals that lined the western shore of the Hudson Waterfront from the mid-19th to mid-20th centuries, along with those at Weehawken, Hoboken, Exchange Place, and Communipaw, with Hoboken being the only one still in service.

== History ==
The Erie began developing the waterfront site in 1856. The intermodal complex was open December 4, 1887. Across the river-facing facade was New York, Lake Erie and Western Railroad, the name of the entity that built it, though it was also called Jersey City Terminal Station or Erie Railroad Station The colloquial name is taken from the 17th century European settlement of Pavonia, New Netherland, which began in the area and the ferry that served it. It has been described as "a brightly colored Victorian eclectic three story terminal located at the foot of Pavonia Avenue to serve a twelve track" station. It was designed by George E. Archer. The end of track was at about 40.7266 N 74.0304 W. Besides the railroad, the complex was served by ferries, streetcars and the rapid transit Hudson and Manhattan Railroad (now PATH). The terminal was also used by New York, Susquehanna and Western Railway trains. Long distance and suburban passenger trains reached the terminal by travelling through Bergen Hill via the Long Dock Tunnel and later under the Bergen Arches.

In October 1956 the Erie Railroad began moving its trains out of Pavonia Terminal and into Delaware, Lackawanna and Western Railroad's Hoboken Terminal, and by 1960 had merged to become the Erie Lackawanna Railway. Erie's Northern Branch trains moved to Hoboken in 1959; the New York, Susquehanna and Western operated to the terminal until it pulled back to Susquehanna Transfer in 1961. The terminal was razed by 1961.

== Service ==
=== Railroads ===
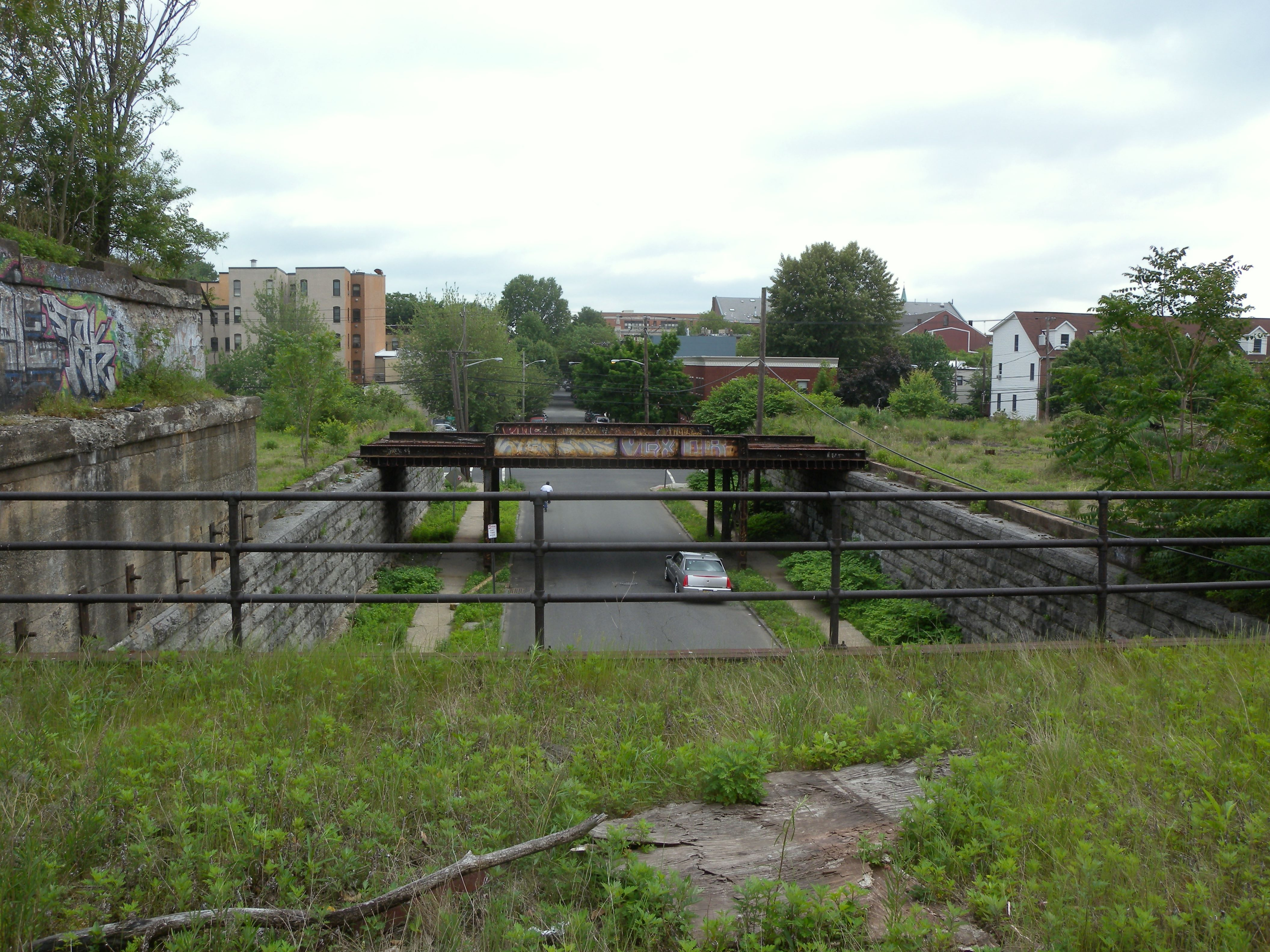
The few remnants of the Erie's extensive holdings include the embankment from the Palisades to the river, now demolished.

The Erie Railroad's Main Line ran from Jersey City to Chicago via Binghamton, Youngstown and Akron; with a line to Buffalo, and a spur to Cleveland. The name and a portion of the route exists in the form of the New Jersey Transit Main Line to Suffern, New York and, under contract for Metro North, all the way to Port Jervis. Parts of the contemporary Bergen County Line and Pascack Valley Line were also Erie operated, while sections of its Greenwood Lake Branch have been incorporated into the Montclair-Boonton Line. The Northern Branch of the Northern Railroad of New Jersey is another line from the Erie era along which freight is transported and that may be revived as light rail service. The last train to leave the station, the #1205 at 6:35 p.m. on Friday, December 12, 1958, was along the Northern Branch. The Newark Branch (with continuing service to Paterson) and the Orange Branch were also parts of its suburban network. The New York, Susquehanna and Western Railway main line ran to Wilkes-Barre, although passenger service was operated that far for only a few years (and that Wilkes Barre and Eastern line was completely abandoned, even for freight service, in 1939), while regular commuter service ran only to Butler, NJ until 1966.

Named trains, many of them long distance, originated at the station. These included Atlantic Express, Erie Limited, Lake Cities, Midlander, Mountain Express, Pacific Express, and Southern Tier Express.

=== Ferry ===
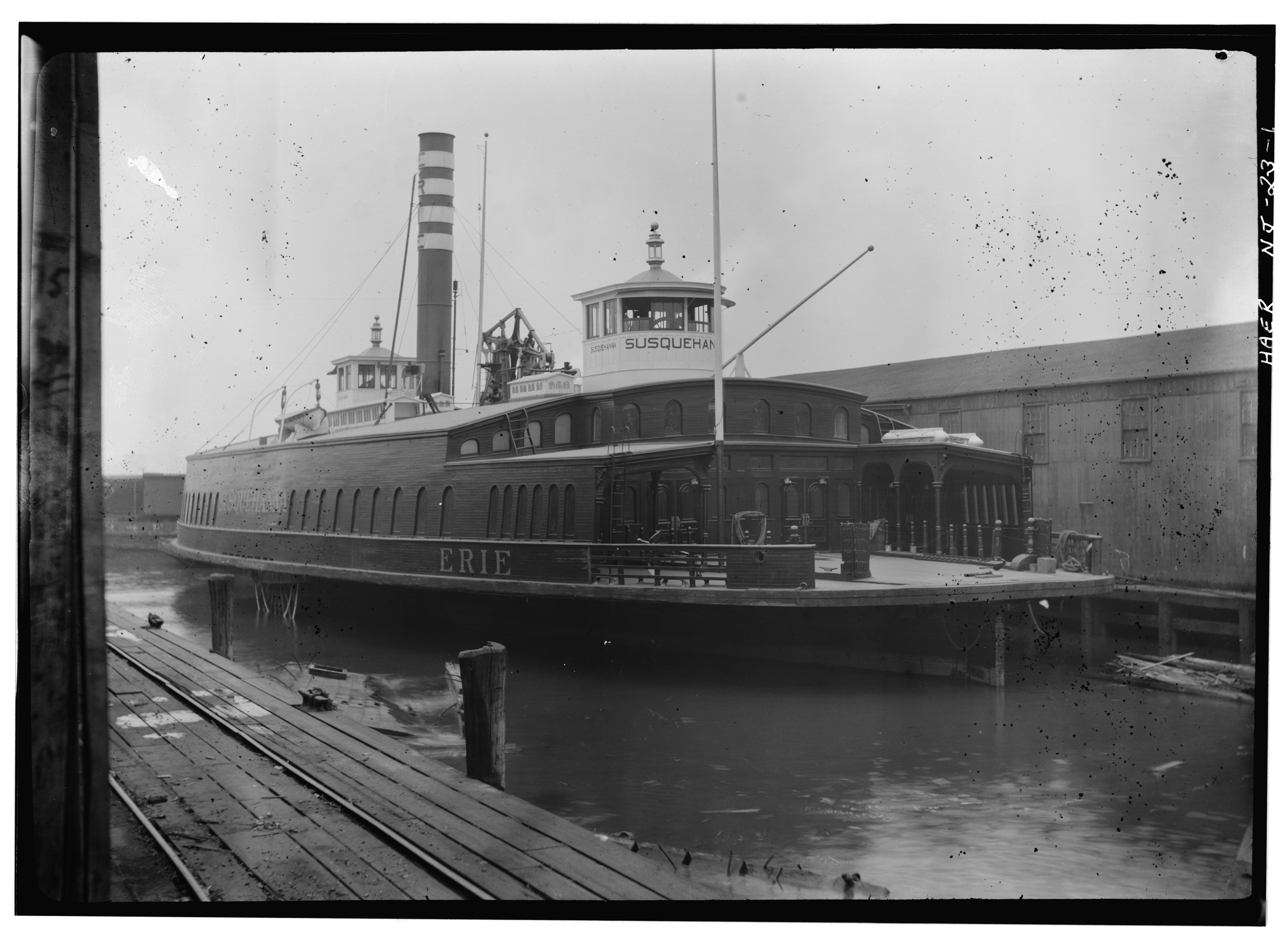
An undated photograph of an Erie-owned ferryboat named the "Susquehanna" docked at the Pavonia Ferry Terminal

The Pavonia Ferry began running in 1851, along a route that had been established some decades earlier as Budd's Ferry. It was taken over by the Erie and sold to the Pavonia Ferry Company of Jersey City for what was considered a low price of $9,050, at New York City Hall, in February 1854. In February 1859 Nathaniel Marsh of the Erie Railroad Company purchased the lease on behalf of the Pavonia Ferry Company. He started a ferry which ran from Chambers Street (Manhattan) to the foot Pavonia Avenue on the other side of the Hudson River. Legal problems had prevented the Pavonia Ferry Company from establishing a ferry along this route. The New York and Erie Railroad paid an annual rent of $9,050 to transport passengers back and forth. Eventually the railroad constructed its Pavonia Terminal on the land-filled Harsimus Cove. Suburban and long distance travelers would transfer from trains to boats for the passage across the river.

Its final two routes from the terminal across the Hudson to Lower Manhattan were to Chambers Street Ferry Terminal and 23rd Street.

New York Waterway re-introduced service to Pier 79 at West 39th Street on December 1, 2006. Service officially ended January 2014. Ferry service is being restored in the Summer of 2019.

=== Streetcar ===
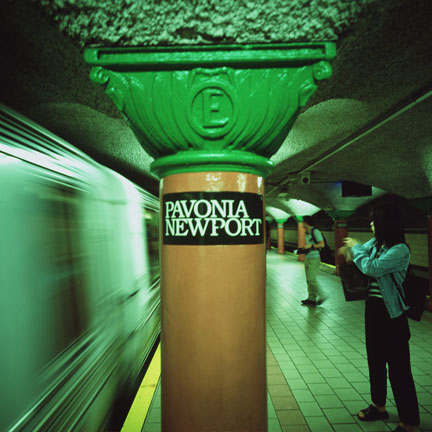
The letter E on the pillars at the Newport PATH station

Numerous streetcar lines served the station. Eventually they (and indeed all of Hudson County lines) were operated by the Public Service Railway. The Grove Street, which operated between Exchange Place and Hudson Place (Hoboken), passed nearby. The Pavonia and the Crosstown originated at the station. The Hudson Bergen Light Rail Pavonia/Newport Station opened in 2002, and is located one and half blocks west of the PATH system.

=== H & M tube station ===
Originally named "Erie", the PATH's Newport station, originally built by the Hudson and Manhattan Railroad (H&M), still bears the letter "E" engraved on its pillars. Opened on August 2, 1909, the station was built with only the island platform. The side platform was added around 1914 to handle the heavier passenger volume. It was closed in 1954 in order for the bankrupt railroad to reduce costs. The side platform remained dormant for nearly 50 years. The northernmost stairway exit from the two platforms led to a steep passageway, which originally went directly to the Erie Railroad terminal. In the 1920s, a second passageway and mezzanine area was built over the existing platforms and northbound trackway. This second passageway and mezzanine area were also closed in 1954 (as was also the entrance to/from Henderson Street), but was reopened in the late 1980s/early 1990s after the station was renovated. Also in 1954, the first moving sidewalk, or travellator, in the United States was installed. Named the "Speedwalk" and built by Goodyear, it was 277 feet (84 m) long and moved up a 10-percent grade at a speed of 1.5 miles per hour (2.4 km/h). The walkway was removed a few years later when traffic patterns at the station changed.

== Site ==
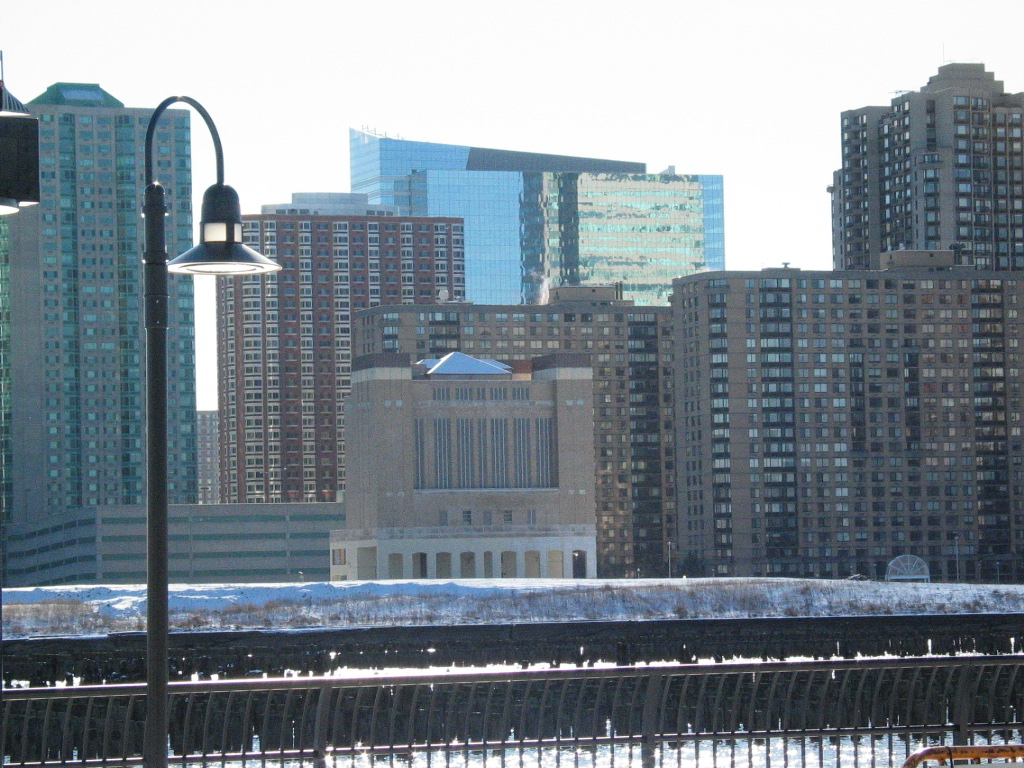
Site of former terminal across the Long Slip. The ventilation tower is part of Holland Tunnel, which contributed to the demise of terminals along the west bank of the North River.

The complex was built on the northern portion of landfilled Harsimus Cove. The southern part was the Pennsylvania Railroad abattoir and freight yard. A narrow slip kept that name, while another called the Long Slip was created and separated it from Hoboken Terminal. The only visible trace of the Erie's waterfront complex that remains today is part of the right of way/viaduct which carried trains from the foot of the Palisades escarpment to the waterfront. Part of it runs parallel to Boyle Plaza (the toll plaza for the Holland Tunnel) and is used for motor vehicular traffic to the Newport district of Jersey City.

== See also ==
- North River (Hudson River)
- Bergen Hill
- Timeline of Jersey City area railroads
- List of ferries across the Hudson River in New York City
- List of historical passenger rail services serving New York City
- Houston, West Street and Pavonia Ferry Railroad
- Pier 63
