= 69th Street station (NJ Transit) =

69th Street

General information
- Location: West Side Avenue; North Bergen, New Jersey; US
- Coordinates: 40.801873°N 74.026798°W
- Owner: NJ Transit
- Connections: NJT 121

History
- Opened: Proposed

Proposed services
| Preceding station | NJ Transit | Following station |
|---|---|---|
| Tonnelle Avenue toward West Side Avenue | West Side–Tonnelle Northern Branch | 91st Street toward Englewood Hospital |
| Tonnelle Avenue toward Hoboken | Hoboken–Tonnelle Northern Branch | 91st Street toward Englewood Hospital |
| Tonnelle Avenue Terminus | Passaic–Bergen–Hudson Transit (TBD) | 91st Street toward Hawthorne |
Location

69th Street is a proposed interchange station in North Bergen in Hudson County, New Jersey. It would serve passengers on two lines under consideration by NJ Transit, the Passaic–Bergen–Hudson Transit Project and the Northern Branch Corridor Project, the latter of which is an extension of the Hudson–Bergen Light Rail. The station would located at-grade west the North Bergen Yard and Tonnelle Avenue.

== Background ==
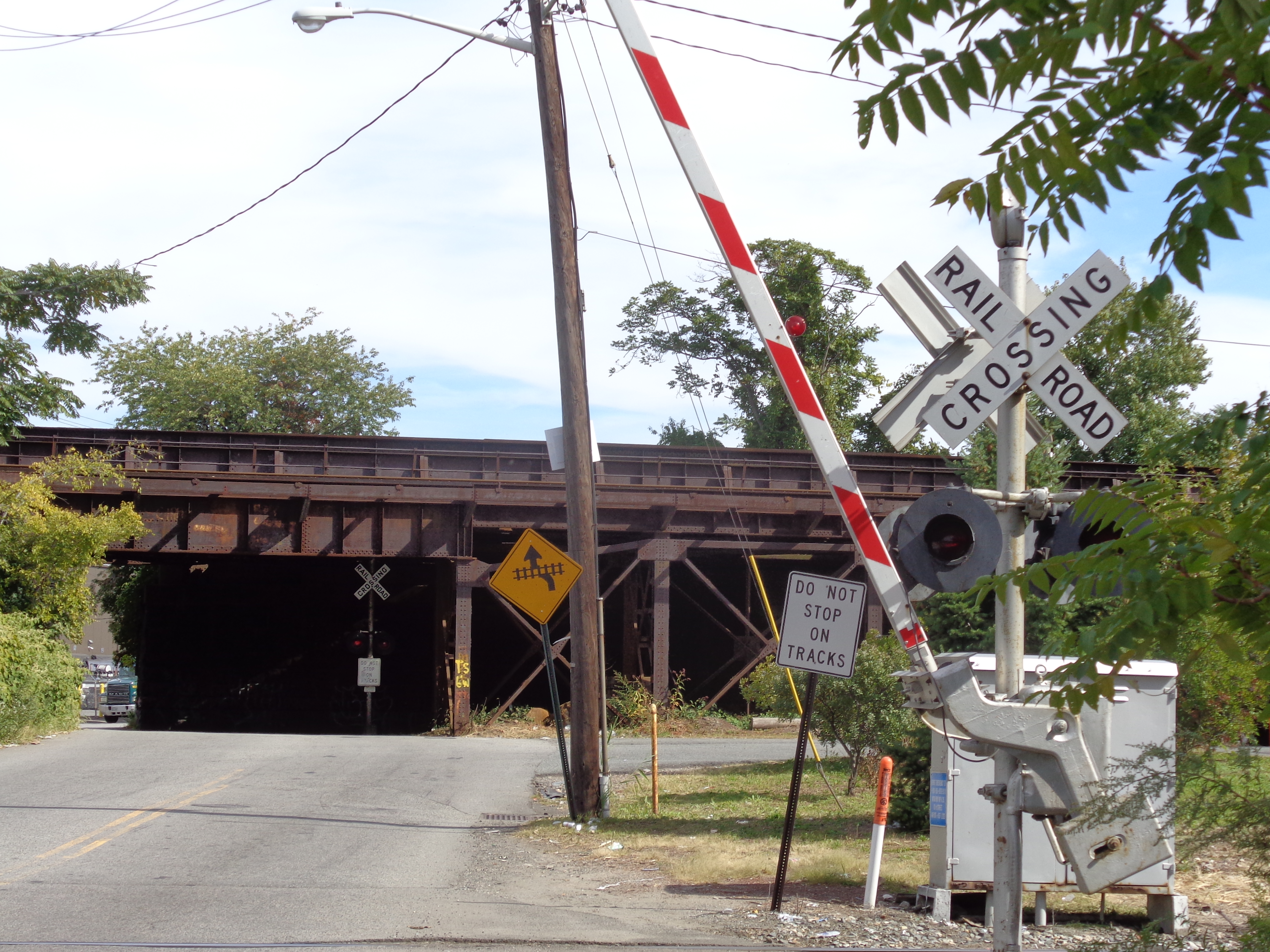
At 83rd Street crossing; NYSW (foreground), River Line (on viaduct), and Northern Line (background) had once been planned station site.

69th station would be located just west of railroad right-of-way (ROW) at the foot of the western slope of the lower Hudson Palisades which had once been used for passenger service provided by the New York, Susquehanna and Western Railway (NYSW), Erie Railroad and West Shore Railroad. At one time the Erie and NYSW shared a station at Babbitt (below 83rd Street). They both later used the Susquehanna Transfer under the Lincoln Tunnel Approach (at 31st Street).

The ROW is now a primary freight corridor for the NYSW Main Line and CSX Transportation (CSXT). The West Shore Railroad line has become CSX River Subdivision of CSX Transportation (CSXT), which also operates former Erie Northern Branch. The CSX North Bergen Yard is at the northern border of Conrail Shared Assets Area (CSAO). The West Shore's former Weehawken Tunnel has become part of the HBLR.

The West Shore Region Study was initiated in 1996 by NJ Transit and other stakeholders and examined multiple modal opportunities in the region that had once been served by the West Shore and the other railroads in Bergen, Hudson and Passiac counties. An alternatives analysis report published December 1999 identified three projects: Northern Branch light rail, Bergen Passaic light rail, and West Shore commuter rail, the last of which did not advance.

Self-propelled diesel multiple unit DMU trains that meet Federal Railroad Administration’s (FRA) structural requirements for vehicles operating in mixed freight were introduced in 2002. They were eventually eliminated for consideration the Northern Branch HBLR extension, but determined appropriate for the Passaic-Bergen line.

In 2004, NJ TRANSIT proposed the Tri-County Rail Concept Plan, a passenger rail initiative designed to combine existing rail infrastructure, the majority of which is the reuse of freight lines, with new construction to create an inter-connected network of rail lines serving Hudson, Bergen, and Passaic counties.

== HBLR Northern Branch and Passaic–Bergen–Hudson Transit station ==
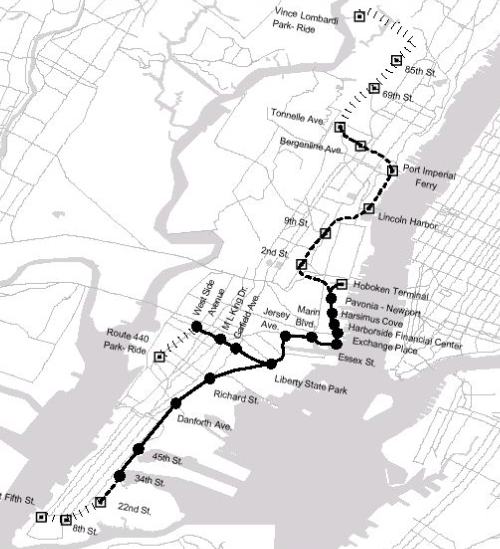
Original minimum operating segments of HBLR

Early proposals for Hudson–Bergen Light Rail (HBLR) included a station at 69th Street with a terminus at the Vince Lombardi Park & Ride at the New Jersey Turnpike. Cost, construction and operating complications of running the line through the North Bergen Yard led to the terminus being located east of the yard at the Tonnelle Avenue station.

The original draft environmental impact statement (DEIS) for the Northern Branch HBLR extension did also not include a station at 69th Street since the original concept was to run the line through the rail yard. The following supplemental environmental impact statement (SIES) saw a significant change, namely that the railroad right-of-way (ROW) would be partially built on two newly constructed flyover viaducts to cross freight train operations. 69th Station site would be located at-grade between them.

The Passaic–Bergen–Hudson Transit Project is a project by NJ Transit to reintroduce passenger service on a portion of the New York, Susquehanna and Western Railway (NYSW) right-of-way in Passaic, Bergen and Hudson counties using newly built, Federal Railroad Administration-compliant diesel multiple unit rail cars. Plans call for a potential station at 69th Street. The first phase of the project calls for service on Passaic-Bergen line between Hawthorne station and a point nearby the former NYSW Hackensack-River Street station. Phase 2 would bring the line to the Tonnelle Avenue station.

The station would be located midway between the current terminus of the HBLR near 51st Street and the first proposed station of the Northern Branch Corridor Project at 91st Street. As of 2021, limited bus service is provided by NJT 121 and NJT 127.

== 69th Street Bridge ==
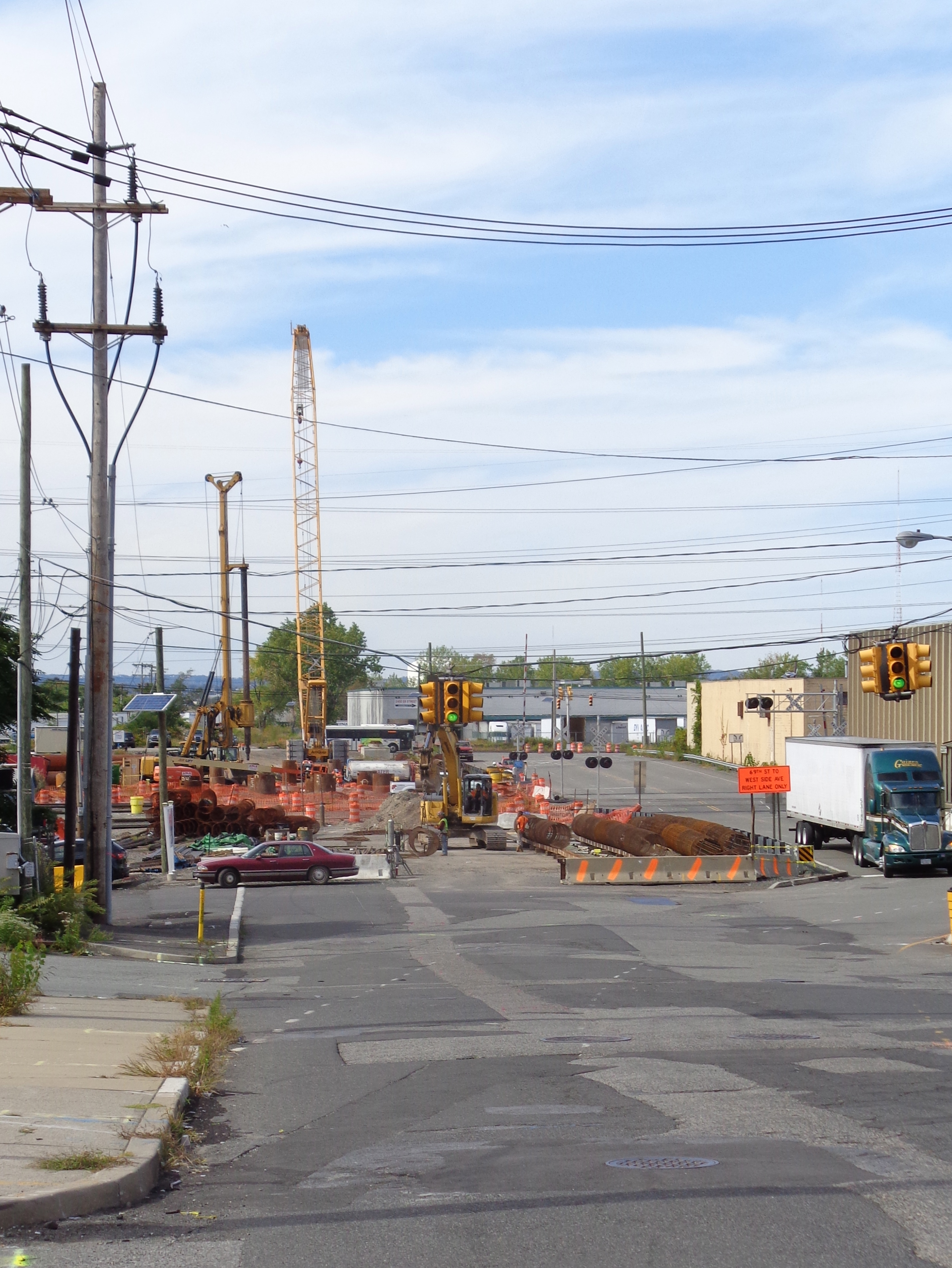
69th Street construction site in 2013 showing at-grade crossing

While not officially part of the rail projects, the 69th Street Bridge is seen as a significant component in success of its operations. The bridge replaced the earlier grade crossing at the north end CSX North Bergen Yard and NYSW siding between Tonnelle Avenue and West Side Avenue. Significant delays caused by long trains created traffic congestion for those working and shopping in the area. Ground was broken in October 2008 but construction was delayed for years due to the first construction company's inadequacies and subsequent cancellation of their contract. It finally opened in February 2019.

== See also ==
- Tram-train
- NYSW (passenger 1939-1966) map
- HBLR map
- HBLR Northern Branch map
