= 91st Street station (Hudson–Bergen Light Rail) =

Proposed Train Station in New Jersey

91st Street
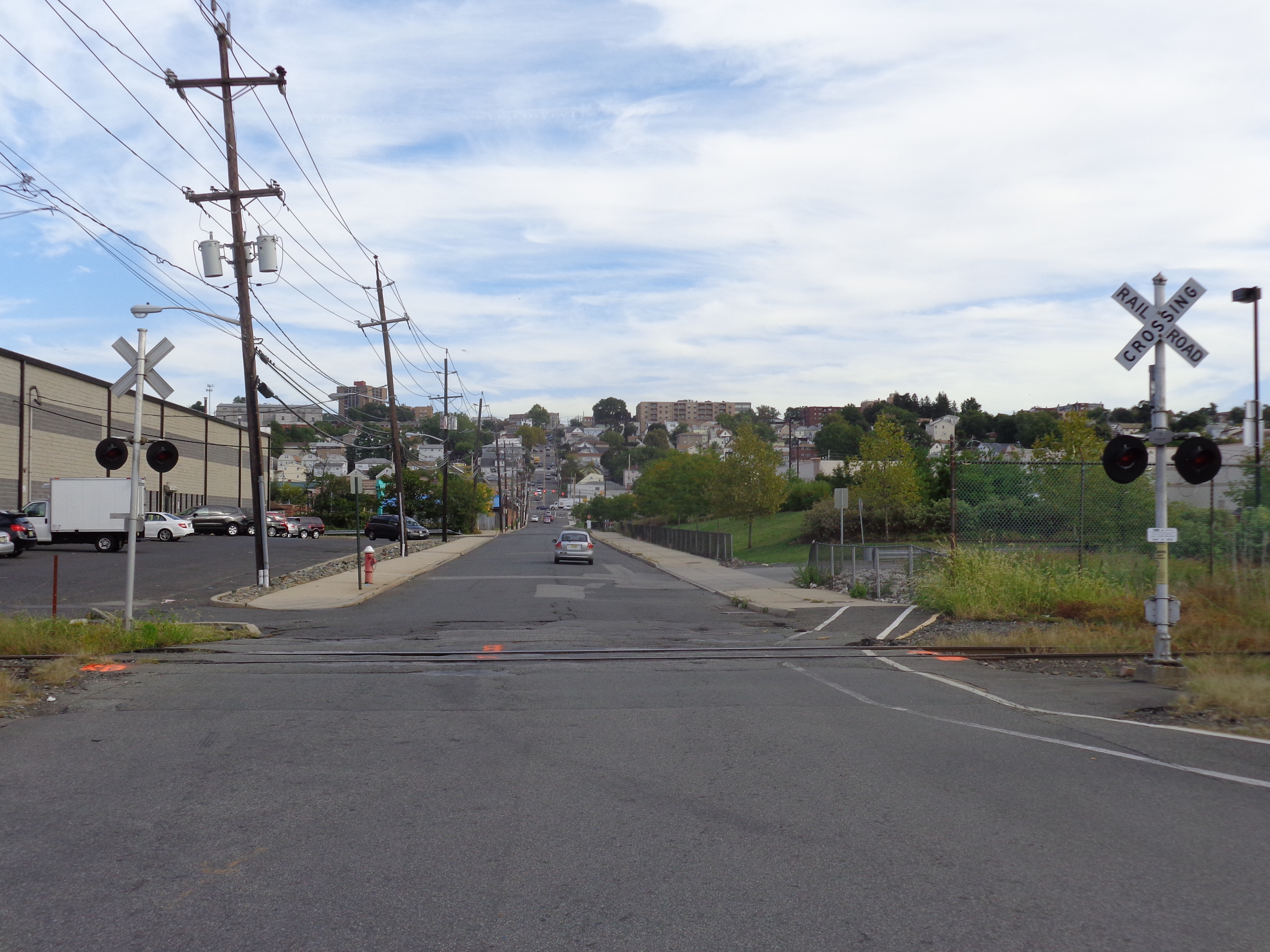
- 91st Street crossing Northern Branch

General information
- Location: North Bergen, New Jersey
- Coordinates: 40.815938°N 74.014889°W
- Platforms: 2

Construction
- Parking: 32

History
- Opened: TBD

Proposed services
Preceding station	NJ Transit	Following station
69th Street toward West Side Avenue	West Side–Tonnelle Northern Branch	Ridgefield toward Englewood Hospital
69th Street toward Hoboken	Hoboken–Tonnelle Northern Branch	Ridgefield toward Englewood Hospital
69th Street toward Tonnelle Avenue	Passaic–Bergen–Hudson Transit (TBD)	Vince Lombardi Park & Ride toward Hawthorne
Location

91st Street is a proposed station along the Northern Branch Corridor Project extension of Hudson-Bergen Light Rail in the Babbitt Section of North Bergen, New Jersey.

The station site is located along the Northern Branch (CSX) south of the Edgewater Branch (NYSW) at the city line with Fairview west of U.S. Route 1/9 (Tonnelle Avenue). It is designed to have two side platforms and small parking area for 32 vehicles.

Erie Railroad's Northern Branch and the New York, Susquehanna, and Western (NYSW) maintained a minor station at Babitt nearby 83rd Street in North Bergen. After diverging the Northern Branch crossed under the West Shore Railroad and proceeded to next station stop at Railroad Avenue in Fairview. The new station at 91st Street is located between the two historical stations.

As of 2021 a study for the Passaic–Bergen–Hudson Transit Project is reviewing the reintroduction of passenger service on a portion of the NYSW right-of-way in Passaic, Bergen, and Hudson counties. A potential route would use the Edgewater Branch right-of-way to connect to the HBLR just north of the 91st Street station, including a station stop there.

== See also ==
- Northern Branch (NJ Transit)
- NYSW (passenger 1939-1966) map
- Passaic-Bergen-Hudson Transit map
