= Vince Lombardi Park & Ride =

New Jersey commuter lot

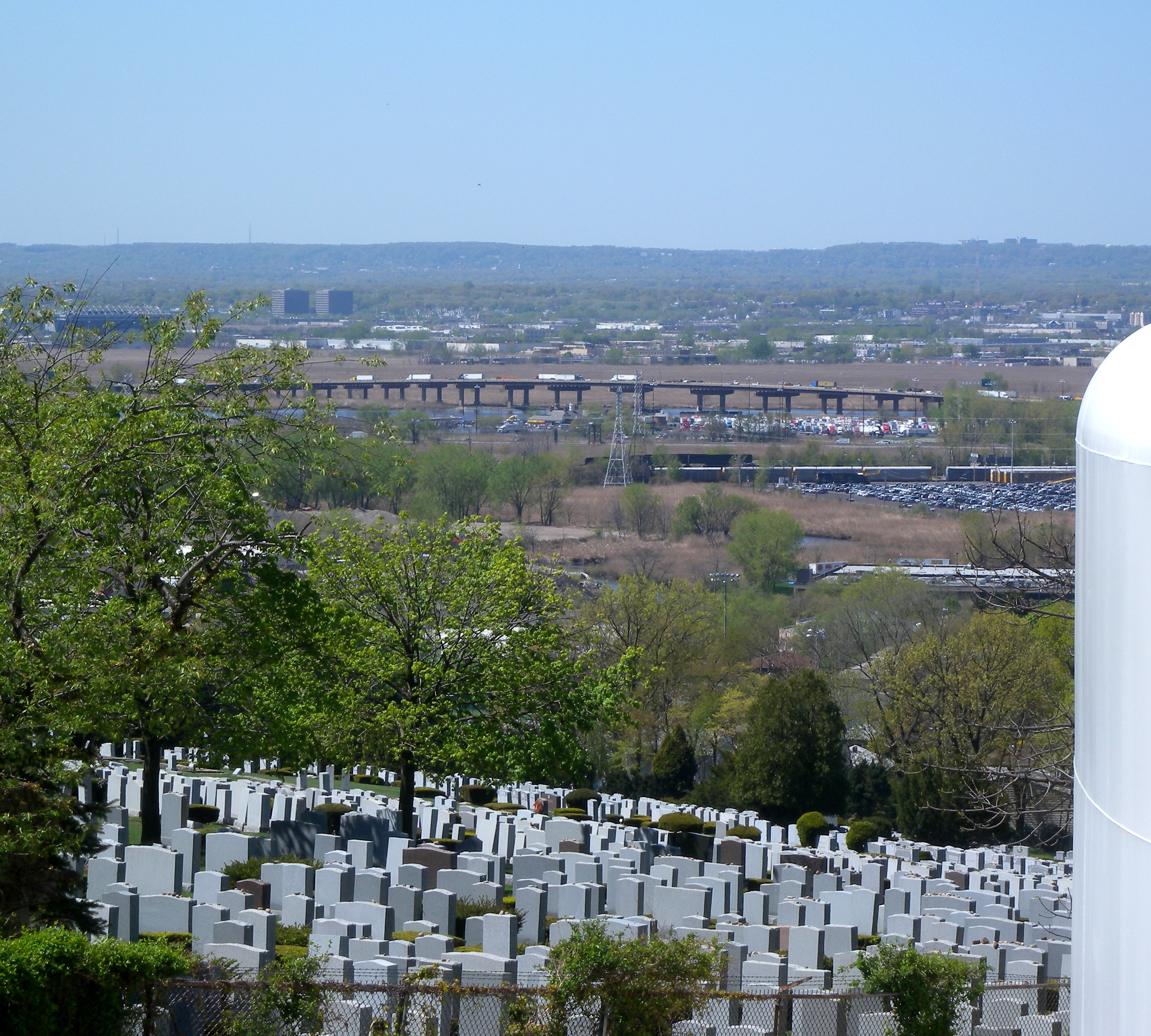
View of the Meadowlands showing Little Ferry Yard, Vince Lombardi Service Area, and New Jersey Turnpike western spur crossing the Hackensack River as seen from Mount Moriah Cemetery in Fairview

The Vince Lombardi Park & Ride is located on the New Jersey Turnpike in the Meadowlands in Ridgefield, Bergen County, New Jersey. The park and ride and separate service area to south of it are dedicated to and named after Vince Lombardi. Located at the edge of the Little Ferry Yard it has been viewed as a potential rail station location since the 1990s and as of 2021, it is under consideration by NJ Transit as part of the Passaic–Bergen–Hudson Transit Project.

== Park and ride ==
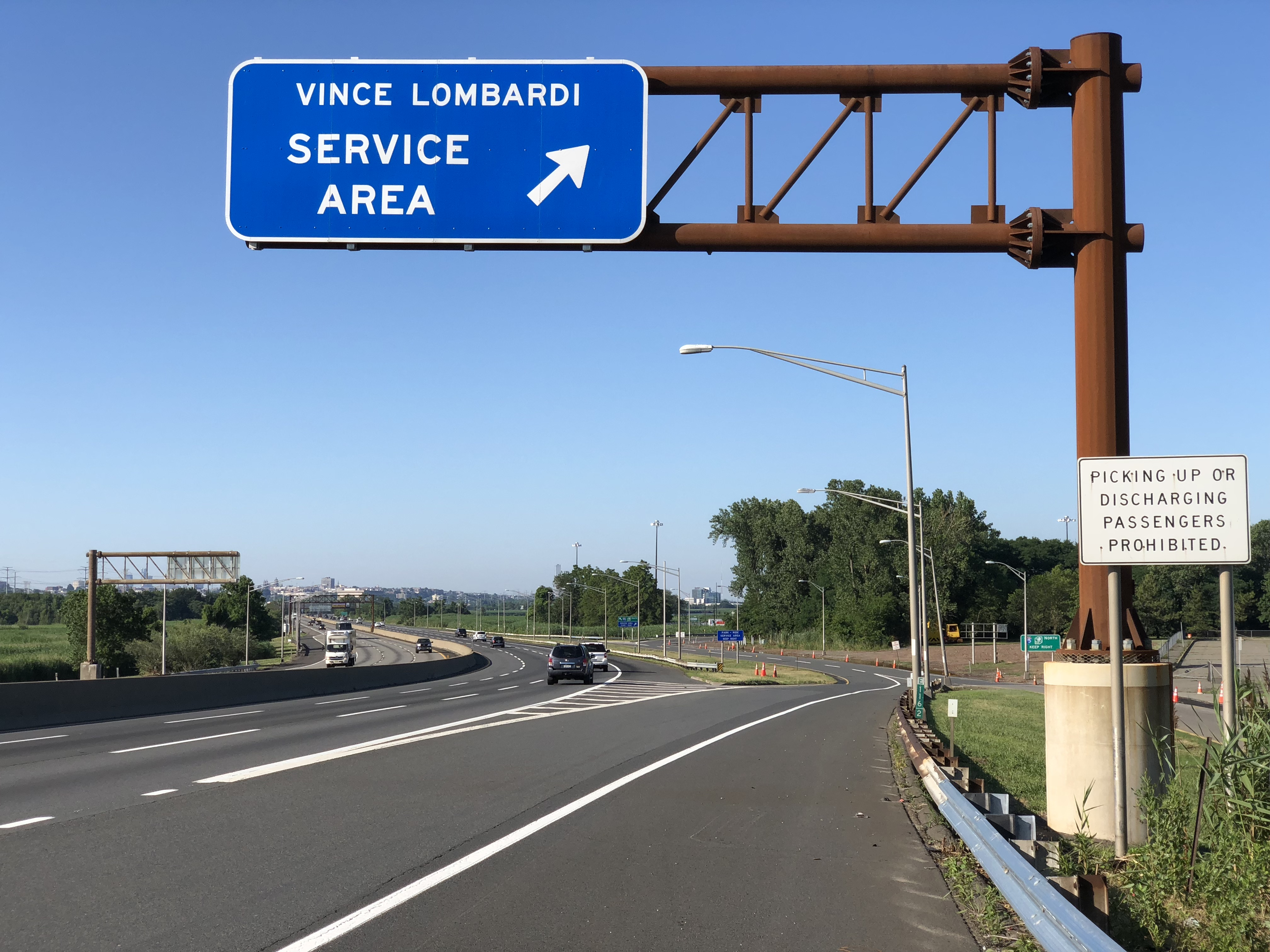
Exit on southbound Eastern Spur (Interstate 95)

The park and ride and service area opened in 1974. They are situated between the eastern and western spurs at the northern end the turnpike (+/- mile marker 116) just south of the Overpeck Creek bridge, where the turnpike officially ends. They are operated by the New Jersey Turnpike Authority.

They are named for Vince Lombardi, who worked at St. Cecilia's High School in nearby Englewood as a Latin and chemistry teacher and later become a legendary coach in the National Football League.

As of 2017, about 1.6 million used the service area annually. It was closed for refurbishment from September 2020 to July 2021.

The park-and-ride has 1022 parking spaces, of which 20 are accessible. NJ Transit bus 321 provides service to Port Authority Bus Terminal in Midtown Manhattan. It was closed in March 2021 due to low-ridership caused by COVID-19 pandemic in New Jersey, but has since re-opened for weekday parking at $9.75/day (including transit).

== Proposed rail station ==
Vince Lombardi Park & Ride

General information
- Location: New Jersey Turnpike; Ridgefield Park, New Jersey
- Coordinates: 40.829511°N 74.025482°W
- Owner: NJ Transit

Construction
- Parking: 1042

History
- Opened: Proposed

Proposed services
Preceding station	NJ Transit	Following station
91st Street toward Tonnelle Avenue	Passaic–Bergen–Hudson Transit (TBD)	Mount Vernon Street toward Hawthorne
Location

=== Location ===
The park and ride lies south of the New York, Susquehanna and Western (NYSW) Edgewater Branch at the periphery of Little Ferry Yard. Passenger service had once passed through the yard the on New York, Susquehanna and Western Railway (until 1966) and West Shore Railroad (until 1959). The right-of-way (ROW) is now a primary freight corridor for the NYSW Main Line and CSX Transportation (CSXT), the West Shore Railroad line having become CSX River Subdivision.

=== HBLR ===
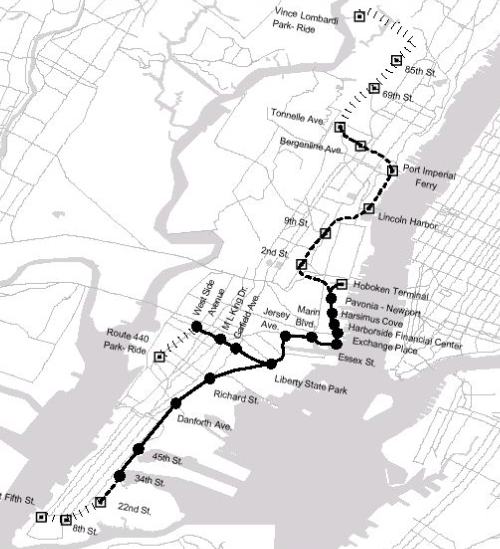
Original minimum operating segments of HBLR

Vince Lombardi Park and Ride is part of the "circle of mobility", as originally proposed NJ Governor Thomas Kean in 1989, to describe a comprehensive transportation network for in metropolitan Northern New Jersey.

Initial plans called for a Hudson–Bergen Light Rail (HBLR) terminal station at the Vince Lombardi Park and Ride, which would be built as part of the third and last MOS (minimum operating segment) of the light rail transit (LRT) system.

=== West Shore Region Study ===
The West Shore Region Study was initiated in 1996 by NJ Transit and other stakeholders to examine multiple modal opportunities in the region that had once been served by the West Shore Railroad and the other railroads in Bergen, Hudson and Passiac counties. An alternatives analysis report published December 1999 identified three projects: the Northern Branch corridor (LRT), the Cross County corridor (LRT) (along the NYSW right of way), and the West Shore corridor (commuter rail), the last of which did not advance. Vince Lombardi Park and Ride was seen as a potential interchange station for the HBLR, the Cross County LRT, and West Shore.

=== Cross County LRT, Passaic–Bergen Rail, Passaic–Bergen–Hudson Transit ===
A station stop was considered as part of Cross-County LRT which would have been an extension of the HBLR to Maywood. By 2003, the project was referred to as the Passaic–Bergen Rail Line. A different terminus of the HBLT extension had been decided and the availability of Federal Railroad Administration (FRA) compliant diesel multiple unit (DMU) precipitated a project re-conception, namely running from Hawthorne station in Passaic County to an eastern terminus Hackensack, but not along the NYSW alignment at the park and ride. By late 2010s the project had further evolved to the Passaic–Bergen–Hudson Transit Project along the NYSW right-of-way in Passiac, Bergen and Hudson using newly built, FRA-compliant DMU rail cars. The project was not included in NJ Transit 10-year capital plan.

=== NJ Legislature ===
As defined by the New Jersey Legislature in the New Jersey Transportation Trust Fund Authority Act of 1984, P.L.1984, c.73 (C.27:1B-1 et seq.), the "Circle of Mobility" is an essential group of related transit projects that include the New Jersey Urban Core. The station was added in the early 2000s.

In 2017, the Legislature directed the New Jersey Turnpike Authority to conduct studies for a station along the NYSW right-of-way.

== See also ==
- Tram-train
- NYSW (passenger 1939–1966) map
- Passaic-Bergen-Hudson Transit map
