= North Bergen Yard =

Coordinates: 40.793°N 74.030°W

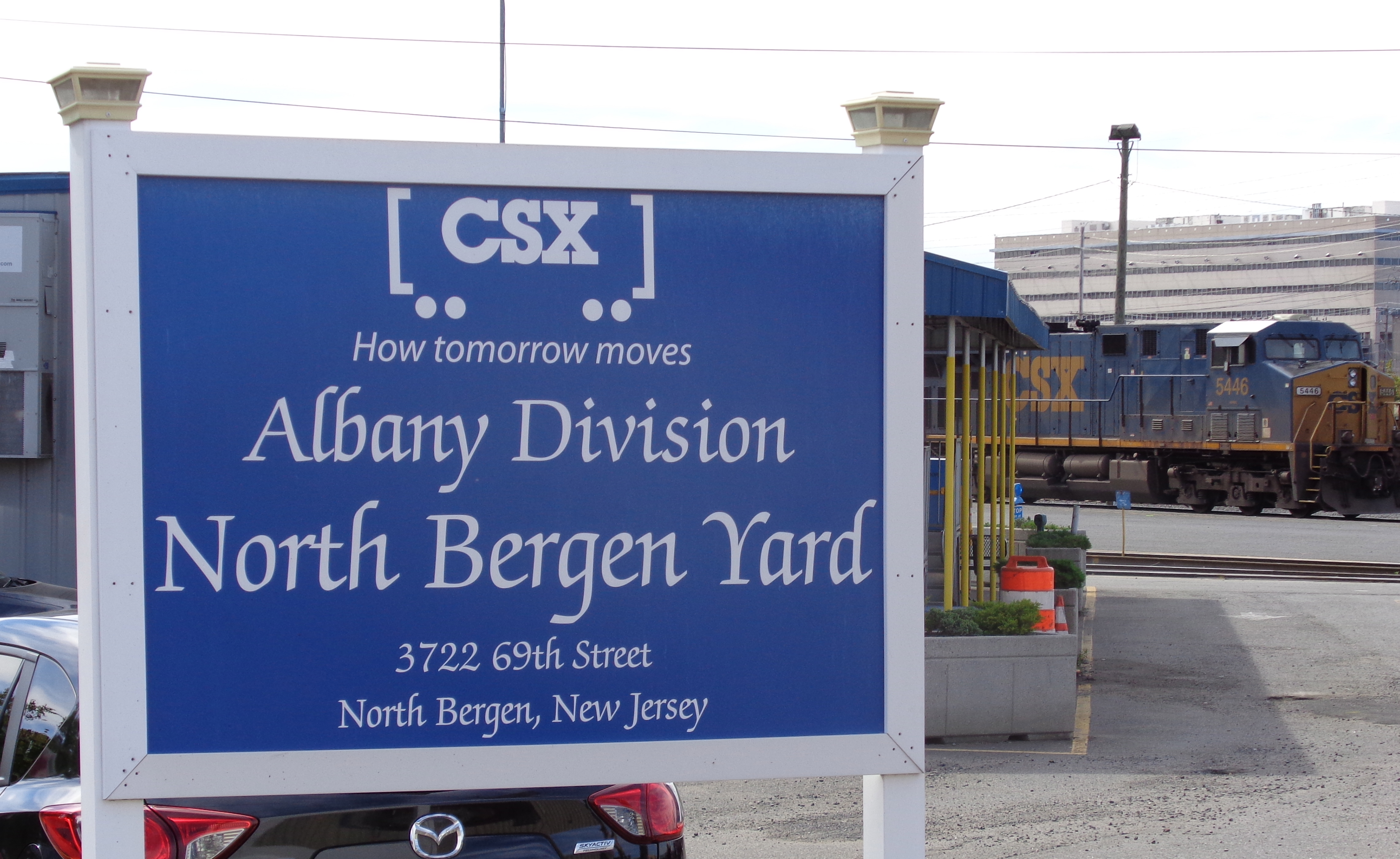
Yard entrance at 69th Street

The North Bergen Yard is freight rail yard and intermodal terminal in North Bergen, New Jersey parallel to Tonnelle Avenue between 49th and 69th Streets. Located within the North Jersey Shared Assets Area, the facility is part of CSX Transportation (CSXT) and the origination point of its CSX River Subdivision at the southern end of the Albany Division. On its west side, the New York, Susquehanna and Western Railway (NYSW) runs the length of the yard and operates a bulk transloading operation immediately adjacent to it.

== Background ==
A rail right of way was laid at the foot of the western slope of the Bergen Hill (the lower Hudson Palisades) in 1859 by the Northern Railroad of New Jersey to Croxton, Jersey City, and by 1874 the Hudson Connecting Railway had parallel alignment, now part of NYSW. In 1883 the West Shore Railroad had also laid tracks. The lines travelled to Marion Junction where using the New Jersey Railroad (later the Pennsylvania (PRR)) they passed through the Bergen Hill Cut to the Pennsylvania RR Depot at Exchange Place. Passenger service passing through yard was provided by the Erie Railroad's Northern Branch, which along with NYSW for a time stopped at Susquehanna Transfer, about a half mile to the south of the yard before proceeding to the Pavonia Terminal. After 1886, and until discontinuation of service in 1959, West Shore Railroad trains travelling to and from Weehawken Terminal would join the right of way at a rail junction at the yards southern end just west of its tunnel under Bergen Hill. This tunnel was also later used by Conrail's River Line until in an agreement with New Jersey Transit the trackage was upgraded and freight shifted to the west side of the Hudson Palisades. The yard was owned by Conrail.

== Southbound ==
The new trackage south of yard travels into Jersey City. Known as the Northern Running Track, it junctions with the National Docks Secondary which travels southeast through the Long Dock Tunnel to Port Jersey. At Marion Junction it becomes the Marion Running Track to the Passaic and Harsimus Line which travels southwest across the Hackensack River, the Kearny Meadows and the Passaic River to Oak Island Yard. The running track also provides a connection to Norfolk Southern's intermodal operations at Croxton Yard from the south.

NYSW operations terminate at the Landbridge Terminal. near Secaucus Road.

== HBLR Northern Branch and Passaic Bergen Hudson Transit ==
The current northern terminus of the Hudson Bergen Light Rail (HBLR) is a balloon loop just west of the Tonnelle Avenue station directly adjacent to the yard. The Northern Branch Corridor Project is a proposed restoration of passenger service through an extension of the HBLR. Plans call for a flyover over the yard and light rail trackage along it western side. 69th Street station would serve passengers on two lines under consideration by NJ Transit, the Northern Branch and the Passaic–Bergen–Hudson Transit Project

== 69th Street Bridge ==
In February 2019, at the northern end of the yard, work was completed on a bridge to replace the grade crossing at 69th Street between Tonnelle Avenue and West Side Avenue, parallel to the Cromakill Creek. Significant delays caused by long trains created considerable congestion for those working and shopping in the area. Located midway between the current terminus near 49th Street and the first proposed station at 91st Street, the site was at one time planned to be a stop along the HBLR Northern Branch Corridor, though current plans do not include one.

Estimated to cost $67 million in 2005, the project had sporadic funding since its inception. In May 2006, NJT announced that $38 million had been allocated for the project. Approval for construction was given in 2007 and ground was broken in October 2008. The New Jersey Department of Transportation had allocated multi-year funding for the project in its Capital Program: $10 million in 2009, $15 million in 2010 $10 million in 2011 at which time remaining construction costs were estimated to be $55 million. There was no allocation made for 2012.

Ground was broken in October 2008 but construction was delayed for years due to the first construction company's inadequacies and subsequent cancellation of their contract. It finally opened in February 2019.

== Northbound ==
Above 69th Street trackage continues north to the former Granton Junction and Babbitt Station CSX's stub-ended Northern Branch continues north as a spur line to the New York State Line. The right of way shared by CSX and NYSW mainlines veers to the northwest to the Little Ferry Yard, which despite its name is located in Ridgefield, New Jersey under the New Jersey Turnpike. It then crosses Overpeck Creek, passing Ridgefield Park (NYCRR/NYS&W station) into Bogota, where CSX and NYSW diverge.

CSX trackage to this point was formerly part of the Bergen Subdivision, The River Line continues north along the original West Shore Railroad alignment through Bergen County, New Jersey and Rockland County, New York reaching the river for which it is named after passing through a tunnel at Haverstraw, and continuing north to a point near Selkirk Yard where it junctions with the Port Subdivision and Castleton Subdivision.

The NYSW at Bogota veers west crossing the Hackensack River, and at Paterson, the Passaic River to Sparta. It crosses the state line into New York at Warwick.

== See also ==
- List of rail yards
- Timeline of Jersey City area railroads
- Hudson Connecting Railway
- List of bridges, tunnels, and cuts in Hudson County, New Jersey
- Selkirk hurdle
- A-P-A Transport Corp.
