= Babbitt (surname) =

Babbitt is a surname. Notable people with the surname include:

- Almon W. Babbitt (1812–1856), early Latter-day Saint leader and first secretary and treasurer of Utah Territory
- Art Babbitt (1907–1992), American animator
- Ashli Babbitt (died 2021), rioter killed during the 2021 United States Capitol attack
- Benjamin T. Babbitt (1809–1889), American businessman and inventor
- Bob Babbitt (1937–2012), American bass guitar player
- Bruce Babbitt (born 1938), United States Secretary of the Interior during the Clinton administration
- Dina Babbitt (1923–2009), American painter
- George T. Babbitt Jr. (born 1942), United States Air Force general
- Harriet C. Babbitt (born 1947), American diplomat, attorney, and former First Lady of Arizona
- Harry Babbitt (1913–2004), American singer and star during the Big Band era
- Irving Babbitt (1865–1933), American academic and literary critic
- Isaac Babbitt (1799–1862), American inventor
- J. Randolph Babbitt (born 1946), FAA Administrator during the Obama administration
- Luke Babbitt (born 1989), American basketball player
- Manny Babbitt (1949−1999), U.S. Marine veteran executed in California
- Milton Babbitt (1916–2011), American composer of serial and electronic music
- Natalie Babbitt (1932−2016), American author and illustrator of children's books, notably Tuck Everlasting, The Eyes of the Amaryllis, and Knee-Knock Rise
- Tabitha Babbitt (1779−1853), American inventor

== See also ==
- Babbitt (disambiguation)
