= Babbitt =

Babbitt may refer to:

== Fiction ==
- Babbitt (novel), a 1922 novel by Sinclair Lewis
  - Babbitt (1924 film), a 1924 silent film based on the novel
  - Babbitt (1934 film), a 1934 film based on the novel
- Babbit, the family name of the title character of Runny Babbit, a book by Shel Silverstein
- Babbit, one of the characters of Warner Bros.' fictional duo Babbit and Catstello

== People ==
- Babbitt (surname), including a list of people with this surname

== Places in the United States ==
- Babbitt, Minnesota
- Babbitt, Nevada
- Babbitt, North Bergen, New Jersey
- Babbitt, Ohio

== Other uses ==
- Babbitt (alloy), a white metal alloy used for bearings
- USS Babbitt (DD–128), United States Navy Wickes-class destroyer
