= South Nyack station =

South Nyack

General information
- Location: Broadway and Cornelison Avenue, South Nyack, Rockland County, New York
- Line: Northern Branch

Other information
- Station code: 2011

History
- Opened: May 21, 1870
- Closed: December 14, 1965

Former services
| Preceding station | Erie Railroad | Following station |
|---|---|---|
| Nyack Terminus | Northern Branch | Grand View toward Jersey City |

South Nyack was a railroad station on the Erie Railroad Northern Branch in South Nyack, New York. The station opened on May 21, 1870, and closed on December 14, 1965, when the Erie-Lackawanna Railroad, successor to the Erie, ended all service north of Sparkill. It was razed in 1970.
