= Passaic–Bergen–Hudson Transit Project =

The Passaic–Bergen–Hudson Transit Project is a project under study by NJ Transit to reintroduce passenger service on a portion of the New York, Susquehanna and Western Railway (NYSW) right-of-way (ROW) in Passaic, Bergen and Hudson counties using newly built, FRA-compliant diesel multiple unit rail cars. Plans call for service to run from Hawthorne south through Paterson, east to Hackensack and then southeast to North Bergen, where it would join the Hudson-Bergen Light Rail (HBLR).

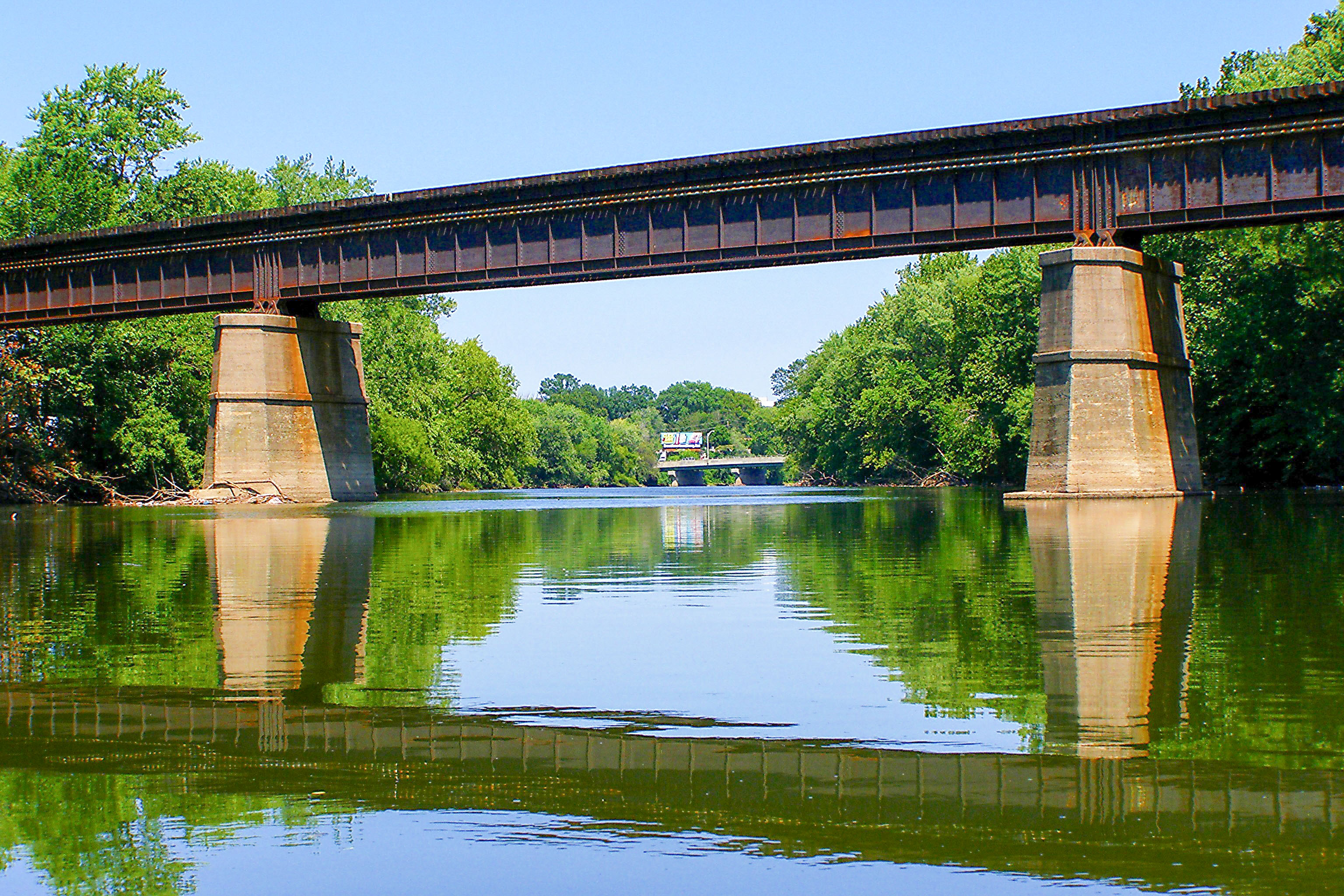
Single track NYSW bridge over the Passaic River, separating Hawthorne and Paterson

== NJ Midland and NYS&W ==
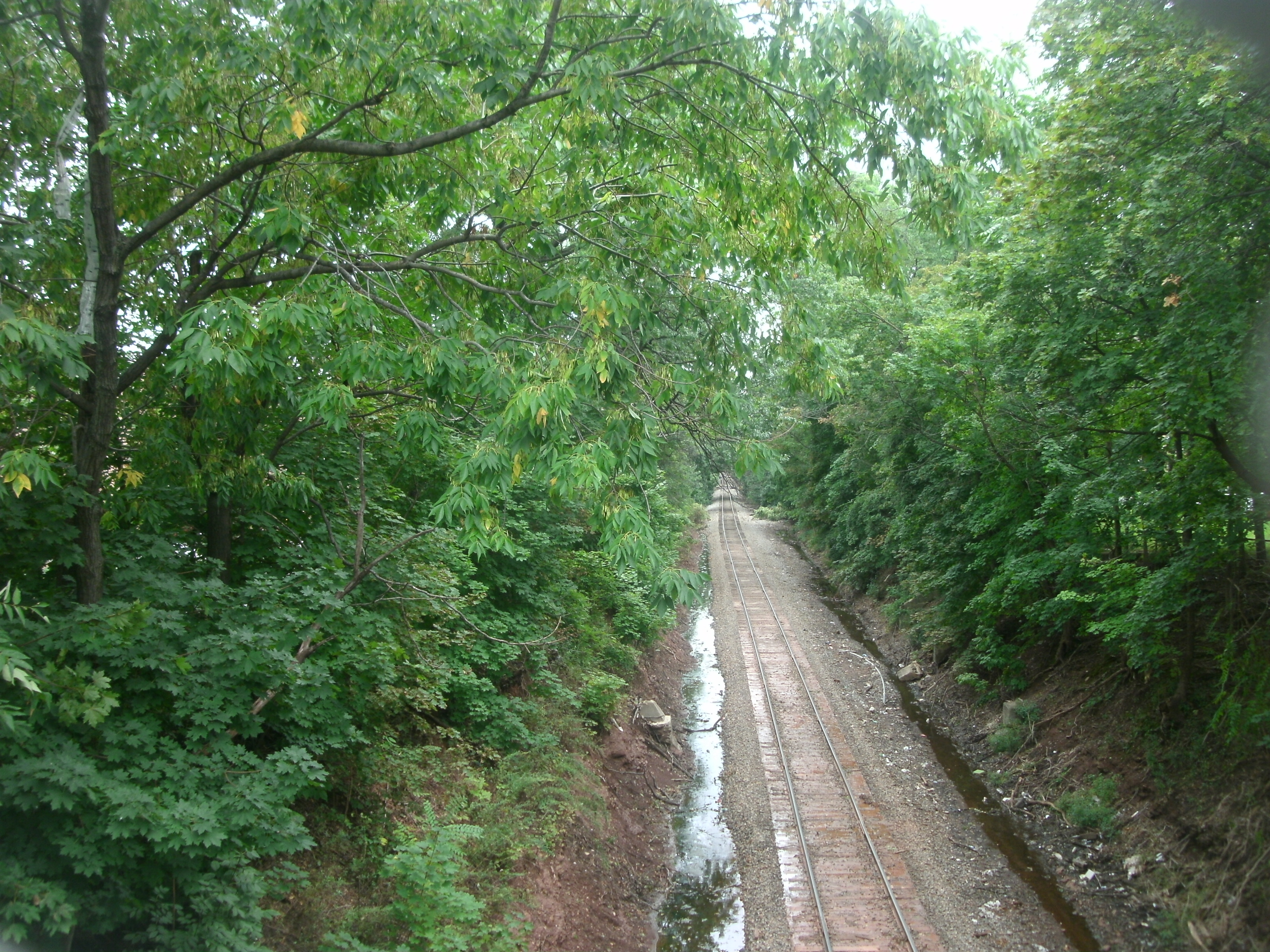
ROW through Hackensack

The ROW was originally developed by the New Jersey Midland Railway in 1872. The NJ Midland and other railroads were reorganized as the NYS&W in 1881. The NYS&W ran passenger service until June 30, 1966. The line terminated at Pavonia Terminal in Jersey City until 1961, and until 1966 at Susquehanna Transfer in North Bergen, which had opened on August 1, 1939 to allow transfer to buses through the Lincoln Tunnel. NYSW freight operations terminate at the Landbridge Terminal south of the North Bergen Yard near Secaucus Road.

== Background ==
=== West Shore Region Study ===
The West Shore Region Study was initiated in 1996 by NJ Transit and other stakeholders to examine multiple modal opportunities in the region that had once been served by the West Shore Railroad and the other railroads in Bergen, Hudson and Passaic counties. An alternatives analysis report published December 1999 identified three projects: the Northern Branch corridor (LRT), the Cross County corridor (LRT), and the West Shore corridor (commuter rail), the last of which did not advance. The Vince Lombardi Park & Ride was seen as a potential interchange station for the HBLR, the Cross County, and West Shore.

=== Cross-County LRT ===
The Cross-County LRT was originally conceived as an extension of the HBLR with service running in Bergen County from Maywood to Hoboken Terminal under the assumption that HBLR would terminate at the Vince Lombardi Park & Ride, as had originally been planned. (A western terminus at Saddle Brook/Interstate 80 was also discussed, as was running the line through the Edgewater Tunnel to the Hudson Waterfront.)

By 2001 the concept had evolved to extend the line to Paterson and eventually the Hawthorne station in Passaic County. An Investment Study/Draft Environmental Impact Statement was announced for the Bergen-Passaic Cross County Corridor and by 2002, the project was referred to as the Bergen-Passaic Rail Line.

Also by 2002, cost, construction and operating complications of running the line through the North Bergen Yard led to a decision for the HBLR terminus being located east of that yard at the Tonnelle Avenue station in North Bergen and was decided to extend the HBLR along the Northern Branch.

=== Passaic–Bergen Rail ===
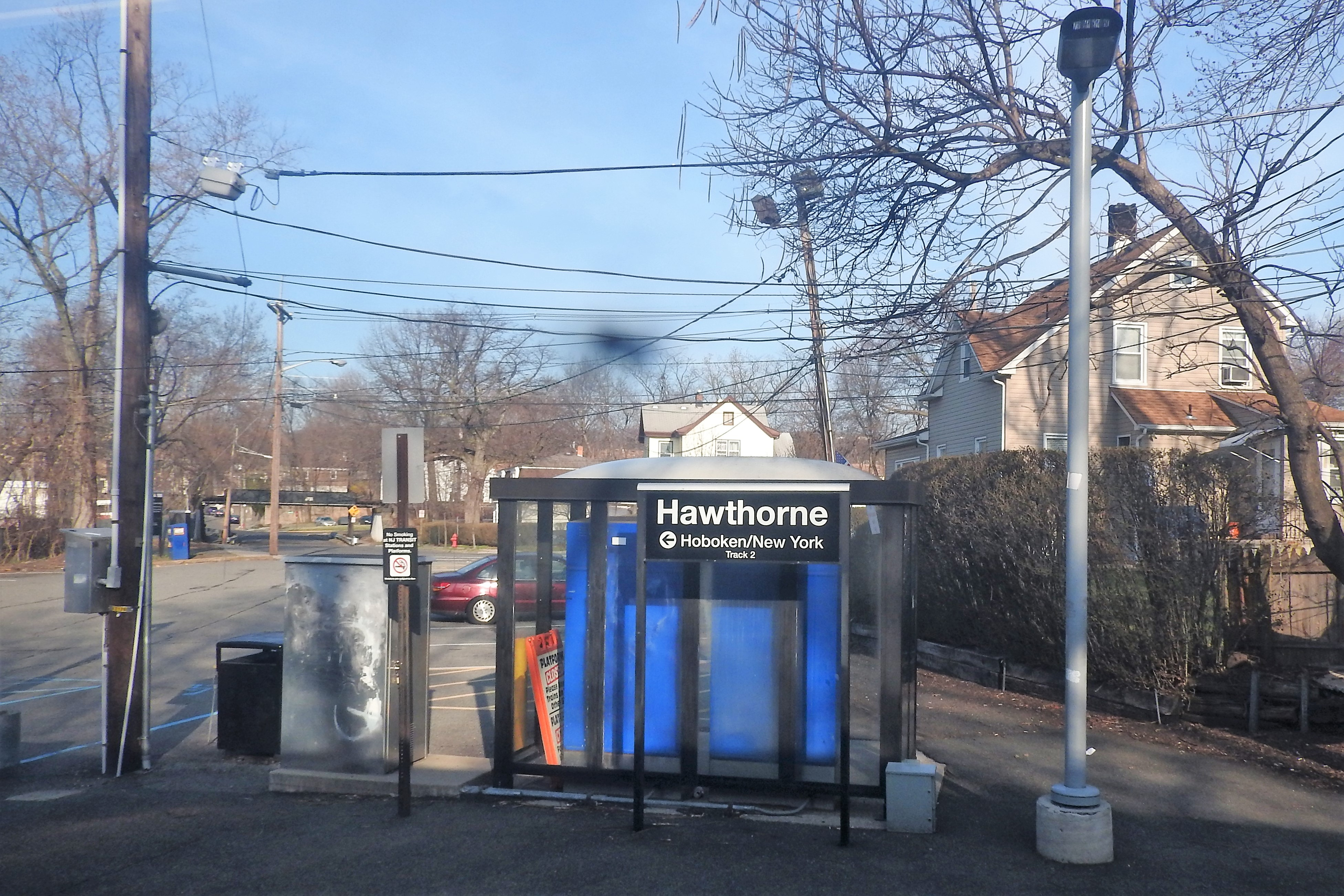
The Hawthorne terminus would be a short distance to the Hawthorne Main Line station for transfers

By 2003, and the project was referred to as the Passaic-Bergen Rail Line. With clarity about the terminus of the HBLT terminus and the availability of FRA-compliant vehicles the project was re-conceived as running from Hawthorne to an eastern terminus in Hackensack along the NYSW corridor using the new equipment.

In 2004, NJ Transit proposed the Tri-County Rail Concept Plan, a passenger rail initiative designed to combine existing rail infrastructure, the majority of which is the reuse of freight lines, with new construction to create an inter-connected network of rail lines serving Hudson, Bergen, and Passaic counties.

By 2006, NJ Transit, the Passaic-Bergen Rail project sponsor, was exploring planning the availability of Federal Railroad Administration-compliant diesel multiple unit rail cars and changes in the alignment.

In 2007, NJ Transit stated construction of the Passaic-Bergen Passenger Service Restoration Project could begin in early 2009 and last approximately 3 years; estimated the cost to be $156 million. In a memorandum of understanding NJT agreed to pay NYSW more than $20 million for a 75-year easement for trackage rights on its freight line. The scope of the project ran from Hawthorne to Hackensack. It engaged SYSTRA for planning and design. The line would run for approximate 8.3 miles in a generally east-west alignment, creating a cross-county corridor running between Hawthorne, where transfer to the Main Line would be available, and Hackensack. There would be five stations in Paterson, one station in Elmwood Park. It would pass through Saddle Brook, Rochelle Park and Maywood, without stops. Two stations were planned for Hackensack, including a terminus at State Street. A new track would be laid for the line along the ROW, the existing track reserved for freight. The river crossing at Hawthorne would remain single track and shared. While outside of the scope of the project, in 2013 the city of Hackensack replaced a rail trestle at River Street close to the proposed terminus with a contingency for a future additional track and passenger platform.

=== Potential stations (2019) ===
- Hawthorne (Main Line Transfer)
- 6th Avenue – Paterson
- Lafayette Street
- Madison Avenue
- 20th Avenue
- Vreeland Avenue
- Mola Boulevard – Elmwood Park
- Bergen County Line Transfer
- Rochelle Avenue
- Maywood Avenue
- American Legion Drive – Hackensack University Medical Center
- Pascack Valley Line Transfer
- State Street – Hackensack or Downtown-River Street

== Passaic–Bergen–Hudson Transit ==
In October 2015, U.S. Congressman Bill Pascrell joined state legislators in creating a coalition to revive the project, and in January 2016, the local governments of the involved municipalities passed concurrent resolutions to restart the project.

In August 2017 NJT released a request for proposal to examine current conditions on the line and needs of communities it would serve and expanded the project to include the connection to the HBLR.

The Passaic–Bergen–Hudson Transit Project is the proposed connection of the NYSW right-of-way with the Hudson-Bergen Light Rail. It adds stations not included in the 2007 environmental impact statement (as well as transfers where there are no NJ Transit railroad stations) and potentially shifts a Hackensack stop to River Street about two blocks from the Hackensack Bus Terminal. The route from Hackensack would bridge the Hackensack River to Bogota and Ridgefield Park, and then cross Overpeck Creek to the Vince Lombardi Park & Ride at the New Jersey Turnpike in Rigdefield. It would then continue to North Bergen, where the line would terminate at the Tonnelle Avenue station on the HBLR. The use of the Edgewater Branch (from a junction in Little Ferry Yard) to connect to the HBLR Northern Branch Corridor Project just north of the 91st Street station, including a station stop there, is being considered.

As of 2015, the two-track NYS&W bridge 10.73 over Overpeck Creek was slated for reconstruction, but funding was unavailable. Before it could be replaced, it collapsed in 2018. The bridge was essentially replaced in 2020, largely paid for by the state. The Passaic–Bergen–Hudson Transit Project was not included in NJ Transit's 2020 ten-year capital plan.

=== Potential stations (2019) ===
- West Fort Lee Road – Bogota
- Central Avenue – Bogota
- Mount Vernon Street – Ridgefield Park
- Vince Lombardi Park & Ride (Ridgefield)
- 91st Street (Edgewater Branch alternative)
- 69th Street – North Bergen
- Tonnelle Avenue

== See also ==
- Tram-train
- Hawthorne station (New York, Susquehanna and Western Railroad)
- NYSW (passenger 1939–1966) map
- HBLR map
- HBLR Northern Branch map
- List of crossings of the Upper Passaic River
