= Babbitt, North Bergen =

Populated place in Hudson County, New Jersey, US

- Unincorporated community
- Location within Hudson County, New Jersey
- Coordinates: 40°48′35″N 74°01′12″W
- Country: United States
- State: New Jersey
- County: Hudson
- Township: North Bergen
- Elevation: 10 ft (3.0 m)
- GNIS feature ID: 874439

Babbitt is a neighborhood in North Bergen Township in Hudson County, in the U.S. state of New Jersey. The area, located west of Tonnelle Avenue within the New Jersey Meadowlands District, is home to light manufacturing, warehouses, transportation facilities, and part of the wetlands preservation area known as the Eastern Brackish Marsh.

== Babbitt's Best Soap ==
The name is taken from the company that produced Babbitt's Best Soap, named after its founder, Benjamin T. Babbitt. In 1904 the company purchased a tract of 87 acres (35 ha) between Granton and Fairview, and in 1907 relocated from its former premises, a 22,000 square feet (2,000 m^{2}) facility on West Street in Lower Manhattan. to what was then one of the largest soap manufacturing plants in the world.

== Granton Junction and Babbitt station ==
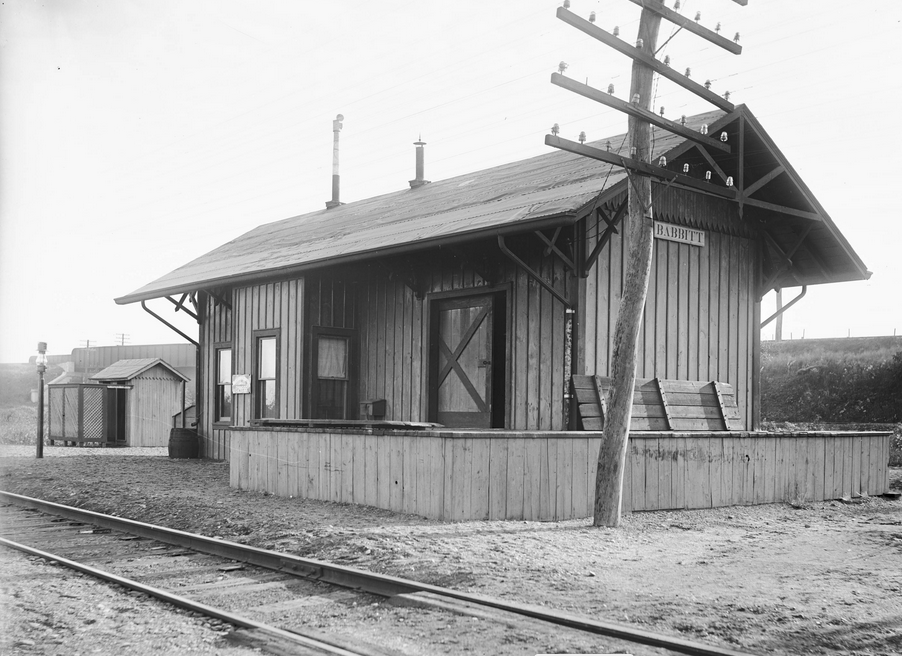
Station circa 1910

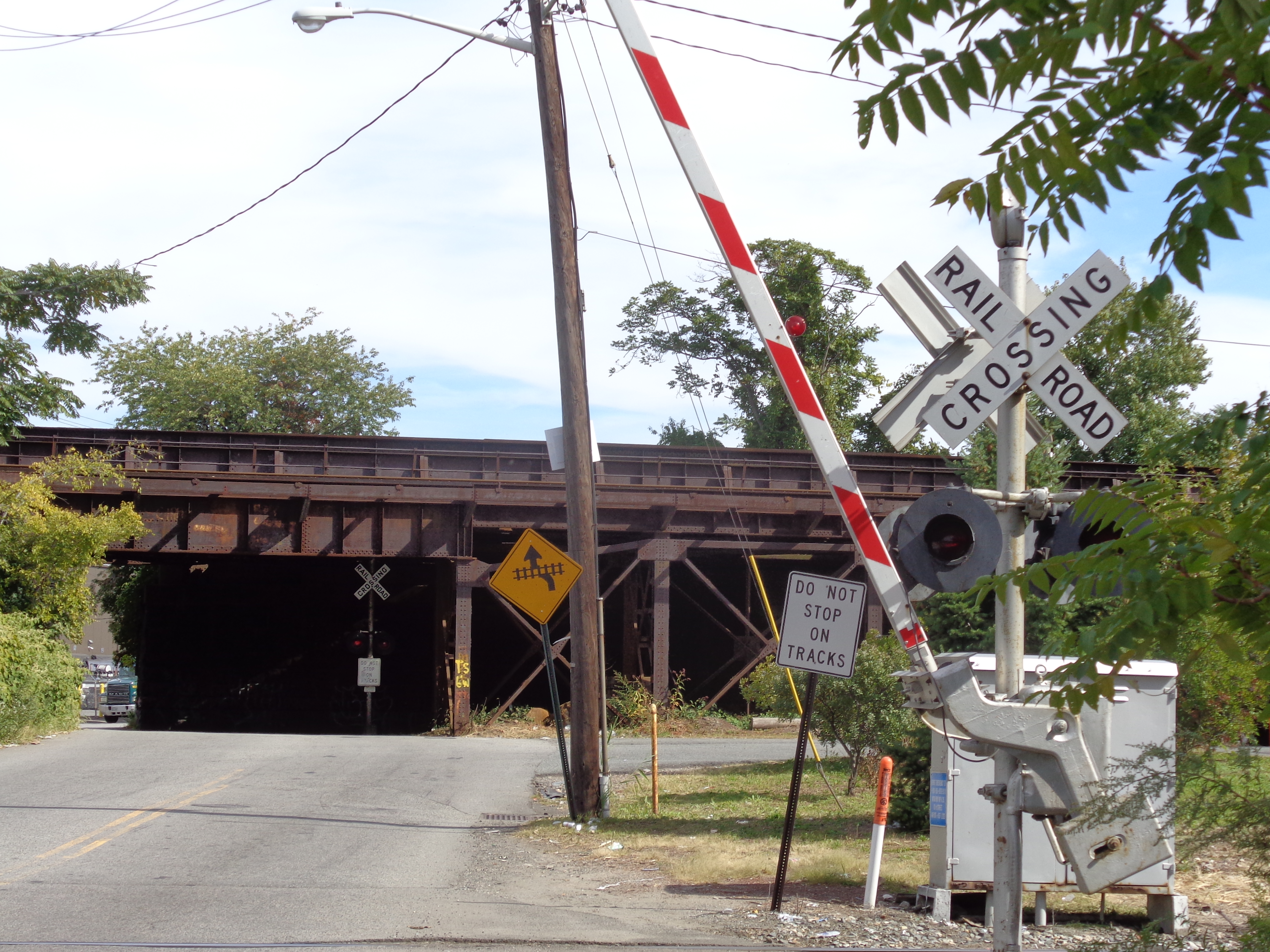
View east to NYS&W and Northern Branch at grade crossings and West Shore viaduct at 83rd Street, which is slated for closure if the HBLR extension is built.

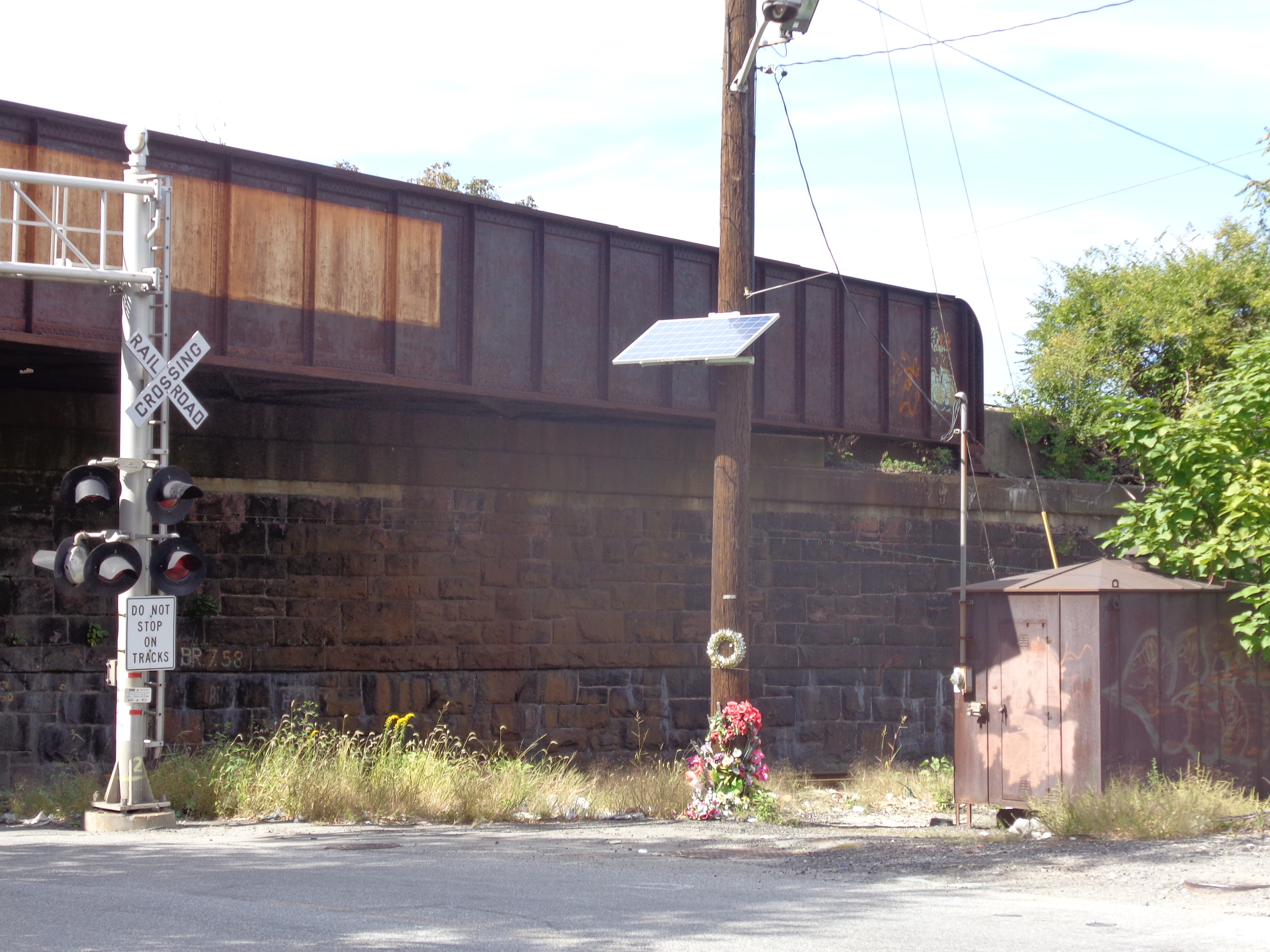
The Northern Branch Corridor passes under CSX River Division.

The West Shore Railroad, the Erie Railroad's Northern Branch, and the New York, Susquehanna, and Western (NYSW) all passed through the area running parallel to each other. Both Erie and NYSW maintained minor stations nearby 83rd Street, which crossed under the right-of-way of the West Shore. Granton Junction was located just south of the stations and was where NYSW and Erie converged after the latter had also passed under the West Shore. For a time Granton was busy railroad junction used by both the Erie and NYSW, which shared track and stations, including the Susquehanna Transfer. The name Granton comes from a former quarry that later was the site of an important fossil find of a phytosaur. Joint operations between the Erie and NYSW were controlled by GR Tower, which in 1959 was destroyed by fire, ending the relationship. Originally the soap works were outfitted with rail spurs by the NYSW, but the soap company shifted more and more of its traffic to trucks, and in 1909 (apparently in retaliation for the loss of business), anonymous agents of the railroad removed the spur after temporarily imprisoning the factory's workers in a boxcar to prevent any interference. In August 1922, a full Sunday evening Erie train heading south to Pavonia Terminal was struck by bombs thrown at it in what was considered an act of sabotage and an attempt to cause a collision.

== CSX and HBLR Northern Branch 91st Street station ==
The West Shore subsequently became Conrail's River Line, and eventually the CSX River Subdivision which begins to the south at North Bergen Yard. Road access to its Little Ferry Yard is located in Babbitt.

The Hudson-Bergen Light Rail extension into eastern Bergen County known as the Northern Branch Corridor Project calls for the closure of the at-grade crossing at 83rd Street and creation of a new one at 85th Street.

A 91st Street (HBLR station) is planned.

== See also ==
- List of neighborhoods in North Bergen, New Jersey
- List of New Jersey railroad junctions
- NYSW (passenger 1939-1966) map
- Northern Branch (NJ Transit) map
