= Northern Branch Corridor Project =

American railway project

The Northern Branch Corridor Project is a proposed extension of the Hudson-Bergen Light Rail (HBLR) from its northern terminus into eastern Bergen County, New Jersey, initially proposed in 2001. If built, the new service would use the right-of-way of the Northern Branch on which the Erie Lackawanna Railroad ran passenger service until October 3, 1966, and is currently a lightly used, stub-ended freight rail line owned by CSX Transportation. The Northern Branch Corridor is at the foot of the west side of the Hudson Palisades in the Hackensack River valley, running for much of its length parallel to Overpeck Creek. After mixed reactions and extensive community input to a draft environmental impact statement (EIS), it was decided in 2013 to terminate the line at the Englewood Hospital and Medical Center. In March 2017 the Supplementary Draft Environmental Impact Statement was approved by the Federal Transit Administration allowing for a period of public reaction. A separately-conceived and funded bridge at 69th Street in North Bergen, necessary for operation of the system, has been completed. In 2017 NJ Transit estimated that the line would open in 2029. In 2023 the FTA rescinded its intent to proceed with an EIS due to the 'all encompassing' changes in conditions since 2007. In November 2025 NJT released an RFP to solicit a consultant to conduct a new EIS.

== Hudson-Bergen Light Rail ==
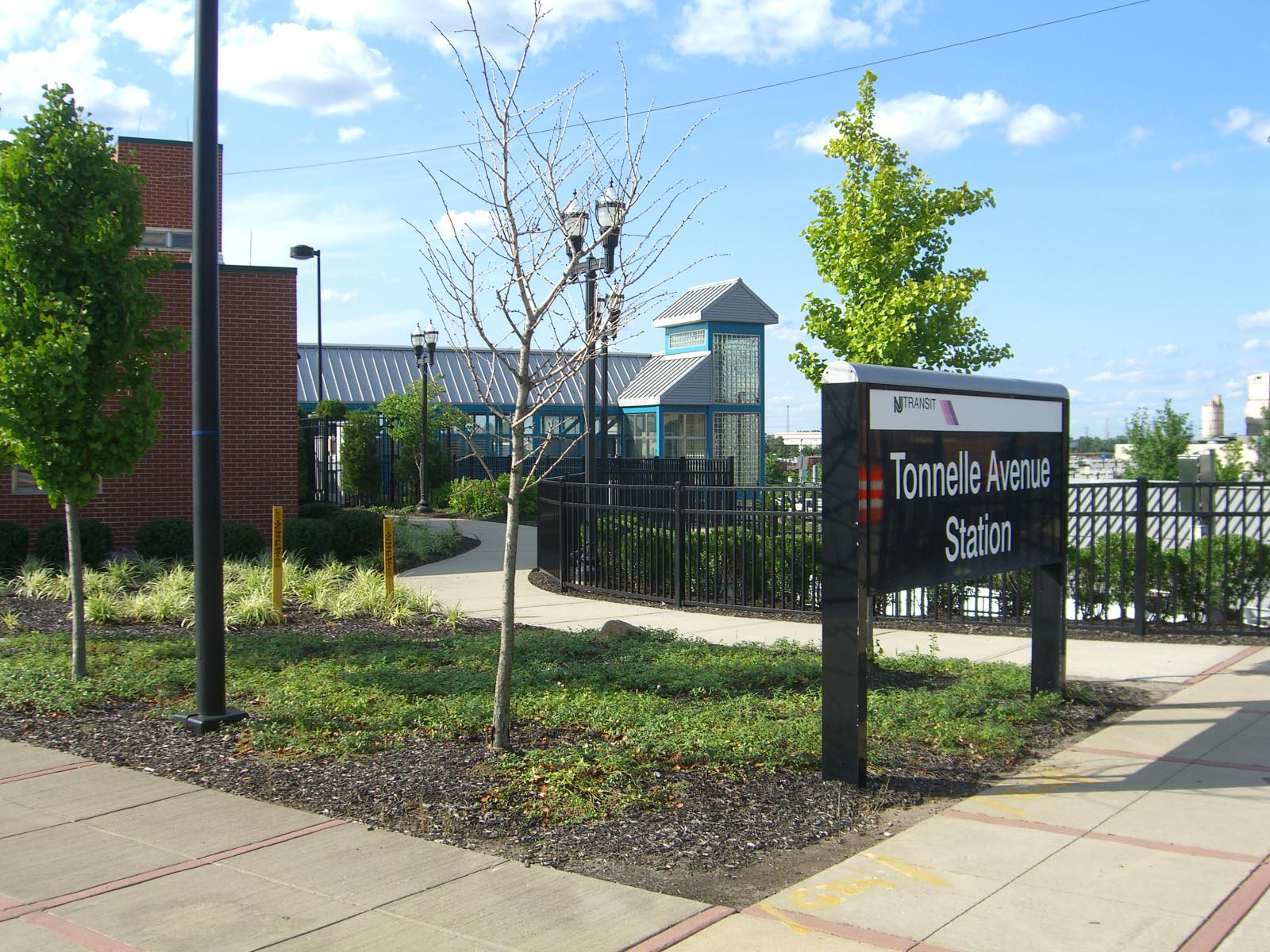
The current terminus is a park-and-ride on Tonnelle Avenue

Original proposals for the HBLR called for a terminus at the New Jersey Turnpike Vince Lombardi Park-and-Ride in Ridgefield, in Bergen County. Despite its name, it currently operates only in Hudson County. Service began its initial operating segment in April 2000, expanded in phases during the next decade and was completed with the opening of its southern terminus on January 31, 2011. The line generally runs parallel to the Hudson River and Upper New York Bay, while its western branch and northern end travel through the lower Hudson Palisades. HBLR has twenty-four stations along a total trackage length of just over 21 miles (34 km) and serves over 40,000 weekday passengers. From its southern terminus at 8th Street in Bayonne the HBLR travels through Jersey City, Hoboken and North Hudson to its current northern terminus at Tonnelle Avenue. The balloon loop allowing for reversal of direction is immediately adjacent to the proposed right-of-way at North Bergen Yard.

== Passenger and freight service ==
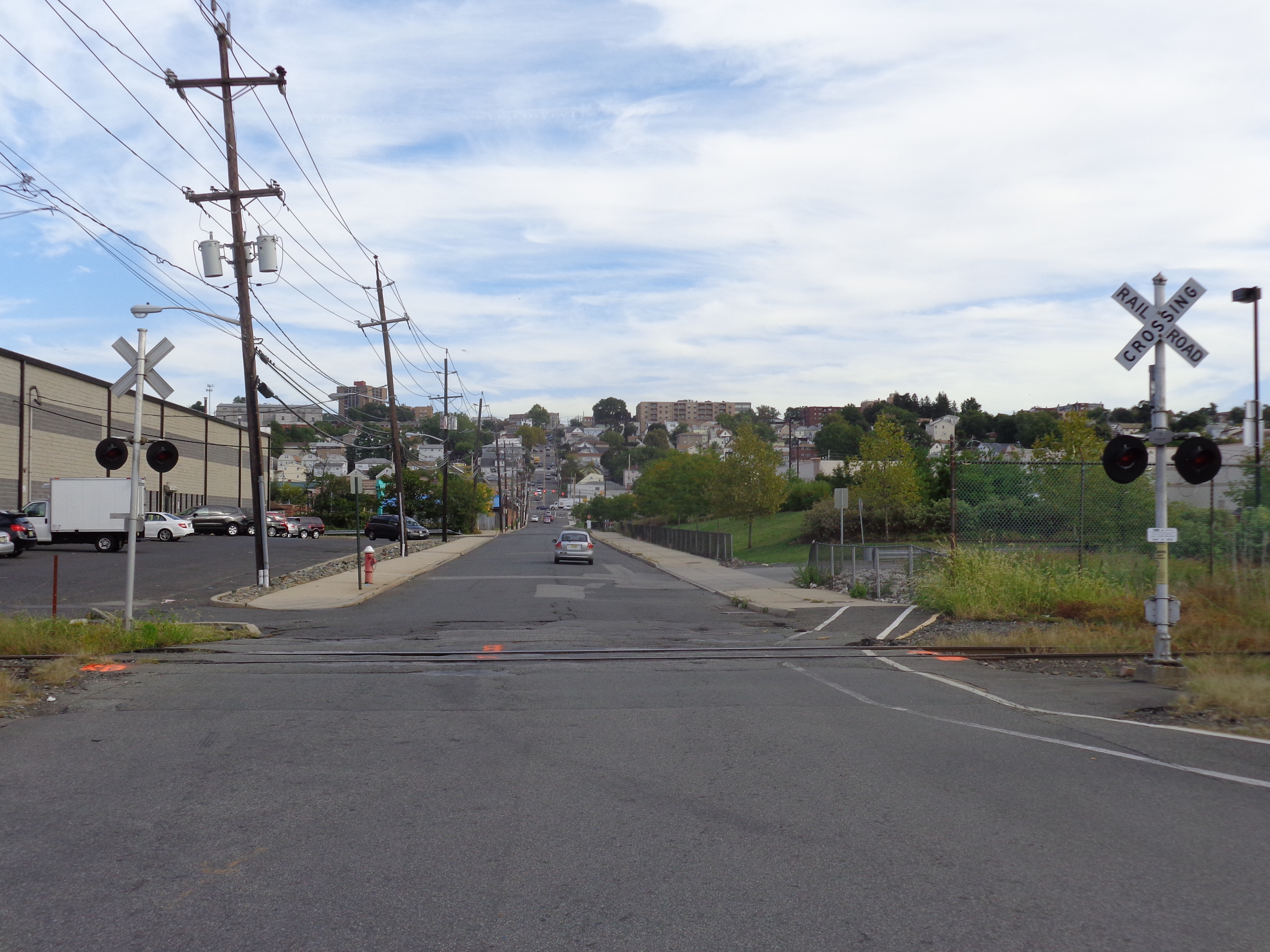
Site of the proposed 91st Street station looking east at Bergenwood

The region along the corridor was known as the English Neighborhood during the post-colonial era and was largely developed after the introduction of rail service in the mid-19th century. Until the 1960s, the area and neighboring communities in the valley were served by regular passenger rail service to intermodal terminals on the Hudson River, where passengers were able to transfer to ferries to a variety of slips on the West Side of Manhattan. The West Shore Line to Weehawken Terminal was discontinued in 1959. Service on the Northern Branch to Pavonia Terminal, and in the 1960s to Hoboken Terminal, ended in 1966.

The stub-ended line is still used to serve industrial facilities along the route. Since Federal Railroad Administration regulations prohibit freight and light rail systems from operating concurrently, the new passenger service would be restricted to running between 5:30 a.m. and 10:30 p.m.

A Major Investment Study and environmental impact statement for the corridor project were first authorized by the Federal Transit Administration and New Jersey Transit in 2001 to examine the possibility of extending Hudson-Bergen Light Rail along the right of way of the Northern Branch. Transportation advocates supported the idea, since it would provide single-seat access between Bergen and Hudson municipalities along the Hudson River. Because light rail cannot operate concurrently with freight service, these plans would have required installation of additional track or scheduling freight traffic late at night or on weekends. Light rail would also require installation of catenary above the tracks and require substations to feed those wires.

The construction, operational conflicts and cost considerations led NJT to consider using FRA-compliant diesel multiple unit (DMU) vehicles, which would have used the existing trackage and minimized interference with freight service on the line. On February 13, 2006, the agency received $3.6 million in federal funding to conduct engineering and environmental studies. Had it been built, it would have essentially been a separate service, with trains traveling south from Tenafly terminating in North Bergen, at a station providing connecting service to the separate electric-powered HBLR. The DMU alternative was criticized by rail transit advocates, who argued that a system which required an additional transfer for Bergen commuters would be inefficient and that the original light-rail plan be implemented instead. The proposal was dropped when the manufacturer of DMUs, Colorado Railcar, went bankrupt.

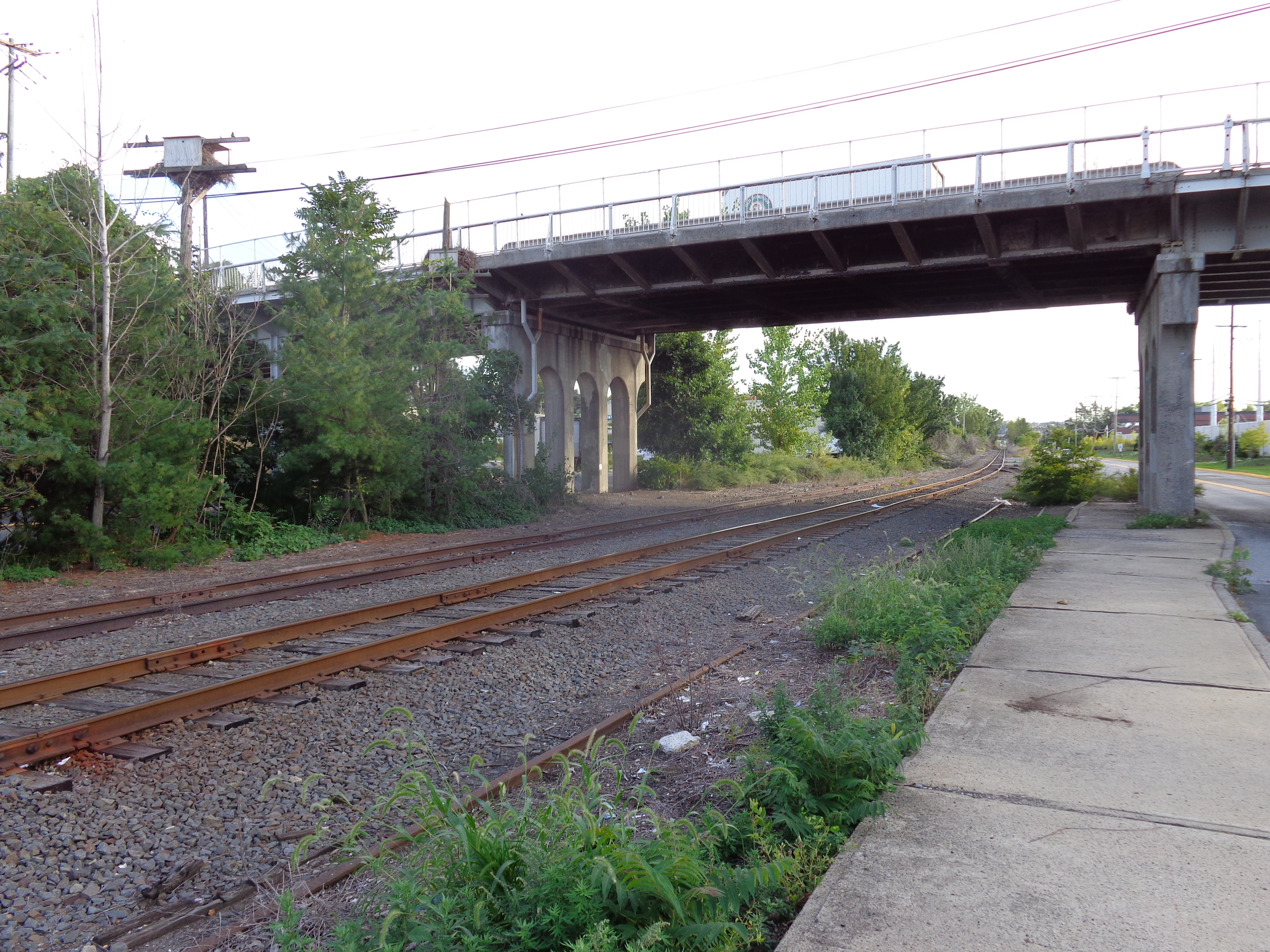
Site of the proposed Ridgefield station looking south at the Northern Branch tracks

== Terminal station ==
The proposal included two possible options for the northern end of the line. One build option would include stations in North Bergen at the county line near Fairview, Ridgefield, Palisades Park, Leonia and Englewood, where a terminal would be built at a park and ride adjacent to New Jersey Route 4. A second build option and the "preferred alternative" put forth by NJT was for an extension through Englewood, with additional stations, and Tenafly to two stations, the last of which would be a terminus at the Cresskill town line.

Response to the proposal was met with mixed reactions, with those communities at its southern end generally favorable and those at its northern end much less so. In Englewood, Fairview and Ridgefield, officials see the new stations as a positive addition to their public transportation system. In an extensive survey conducted in 2009, Leonia residents questioned the benefit for the borough and expressed concerns about traffic and the location of the station at Fort Lee Road, believing it could be better-situated to avoid the congestion it might cause. In Tenafly, residents and officials believe that quality of life in the towns will be negatively affected without much additional benefit. While lending support for the new system in their written responses to the DEIS, the governments of Ridgefield, Leonia and Englewood all expressed the concerns about station locations and their parking facilities, suggesting that they would cause congestion.

Opposition had been most vehement in Tenafly, where voters had already rejected the plan to re-establish rail service to the town in a non-binding referendum in November 2010. Residents and officials rejected plan as described in the DEIS at public hearings in January 2012.

Despite local opposition, officials in Bergen County asked the North Jersey Transportation Planning Authority to support the proposal to extend light rail service as NJT's "preferred alternative". The New Jersey Association of Railroad Passengers also endorsed the longer route. The Record regional newspaper, in an editorial, stated that a terminus in the commercial center of Englewood would be sufficient, since the need to begin building the new line is of utmost importance. According to the town's historic preservation commission, the DEIS does not sufficiently address impact to historic structures along the route.

It was decided in 2013 to terminate the line at the Englewood Hospital and Medical Center after another DEIS was performed.

A Supplemental DEIS was released in March 2017, with a public hearing scheduled for April 24 in Englewood.

== EIS, estimated costs, and funding ==
The estimated cost of the project is approaching $1 billion. Approximately $40 million has been allocated to the project, which was expected to begin in 2012 and be completed in 2015 and projected to have an estimated 24,000 passengers daily. Nearly three years after its submission, the Federal Transit Administration authorized the release of a draft environmental impact statement (DEIS) in December 2011.

A February 2012 review of the DEIS by the Environmental Protection Agency found a "lack of objections" but questioned the implementation of wetlands mitigation banking proposal and the grade separation outline within the document.

In a meeting held in September 2012 with NJT and 13 mayors from the region, NJT said that it had yet to complete review of responses to the DEIS and that no funding for the project had been identified.

With the compromise to build the northern terminus between those originally proposed, the project can be advanced with the completion of a final environmental impact statement. Initially, it was undecided whether or not a supplemental draft environmental impact statement (SDEIS) would be required for the Englewood Hospital terminus. State legislators petitioned the Federal Transit Administration to proceed with the existing impact statement to avoid additional delays to the project.

In February 2014, NJ Transit was directed by the Federal Transit Administration (FTA) to prepare a SDEIS Supplementary Draft Environmental Impact Statement, to be complete in the fall. The FTA approved the SDEIS in March 2017 and it was released on March 17, 2017.

The state can apply for federal funding but would have to provide matching state funds, according to Rep. Bill Pascrell's office. It was expected that, with a new gasoline tax passed in 2016, the state's Transportation Trust Fund would provide funding for the line. New Jersey Transit capital improvements budgets included $95 million in funding for environmental remediation for the project during 2018 through 2020.

In August 2023 the FTA announced that it would not act on the 2018 supplement to the EIS, citing “all-encompassing changes” since then and requested more information about the extension. An NJ Transit spokesman estimated this additional work will delay the project by two years. By 2025, no action had been taken on the FTA's request, and a new study was not planned to be conducted until a consultant was hired in mid-2026.

In November 2025 NJT released an RFP to solicit a consultant to conduct a new EIS.

== 69th Street ==
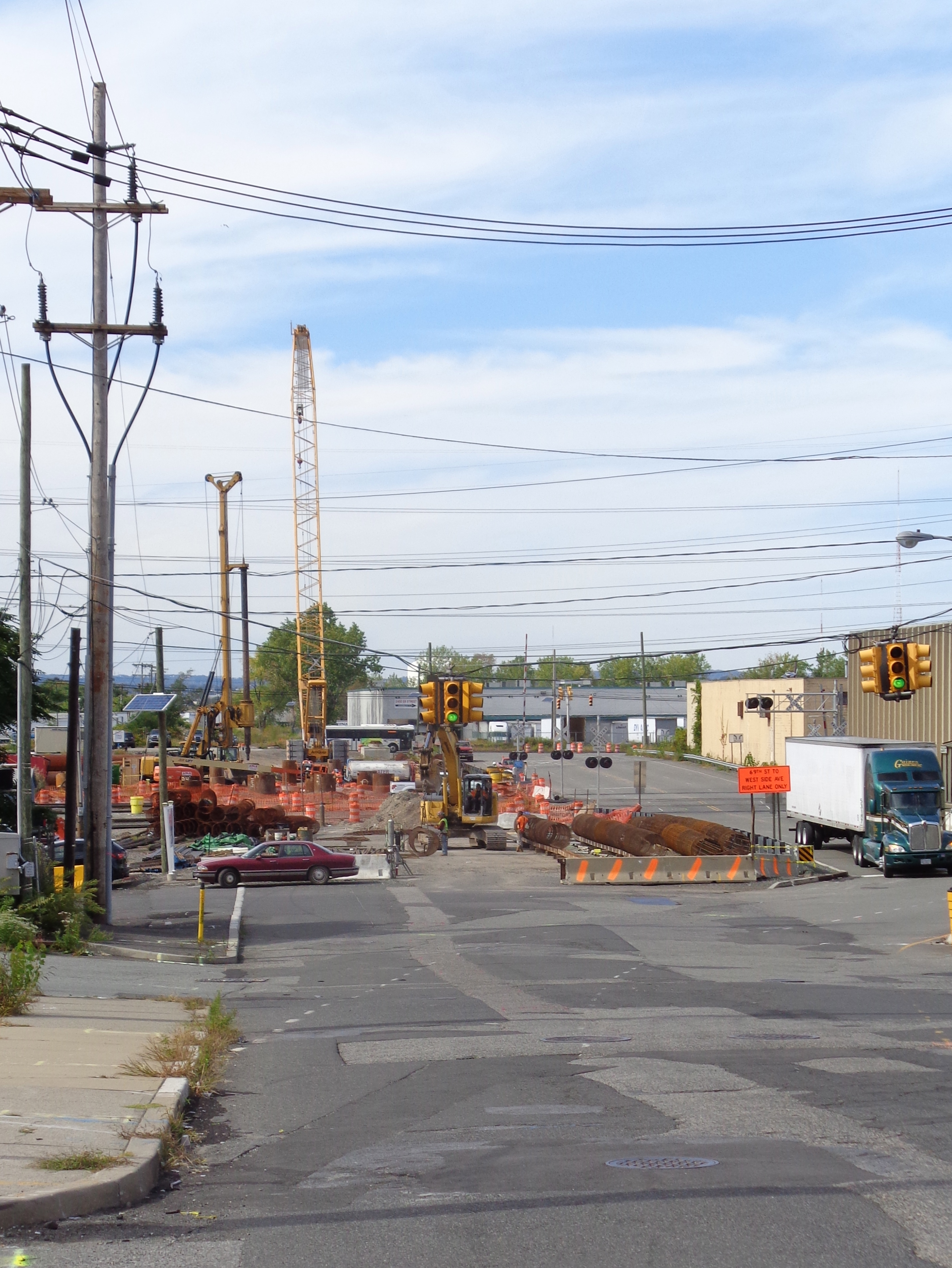
69th Street construction site in 2013 showing at-grade crossing

While not officially part of the HBLR Northern Branch extension project, the 69th Street Bridge in North Bergen was seen as a significant component in success of its operations. It was funded by NJ Transit. The bridge replaced the earlier grade crossing near the CSX North Bergen Yard and NYSW siding between Tonnelle Avenue and West Side Avenue. Significant delays were caused by long trains, creating traffic congestion for those working and shopping in the area. Estimated to cost $67 million in 2005, ground was broken in October, 2008, but construction was delayed for years due to the first construction company's inadequacies and the subsequent cancellation of its contract. It finally opened in February 2019.

Located midway between the current terminus near 49th Street and the first proposed station at 91st Street, the site was at one time planned to be a stop along the route, though current Northern Branch plans do not include one.

The Passaic–Bergen–Hudson Transit Project is a project by NJ Transit to reintroduce passenger service on a portion of the New York, Susquehanna and Western Railway (NYSW) right-of-way in Passaic, Bergen and Hudson counties, using newly-built FRA-compliant diesel multiple unit rail cars. Plans call for a potential station at 69th Street.

== Project status ==
In March 2014, the mayors of Jersey City, North Hudson and the towns of Bergen County along the route created a commission to promote the construction of the line. In July 2014, Englewood hired an engineering consulting firm to review environmental impact statements and exchanges between the municipality and NJT.

In October 2016, state legislators passed a resolution to make the project a top transportation project for the state. In 2020 NJ Transit projected the extension to cost $1.18B USD As of December 2022, the project is still in its design phase, and NJT was given a $600K federal grant to study transit-oriented development along the proposed extension. However the FTA's refusal to review the 2018 EIS supplement is estimated to delay the project into 2025.
