= Benjamin T. Babbitt =

American businessman and inventor

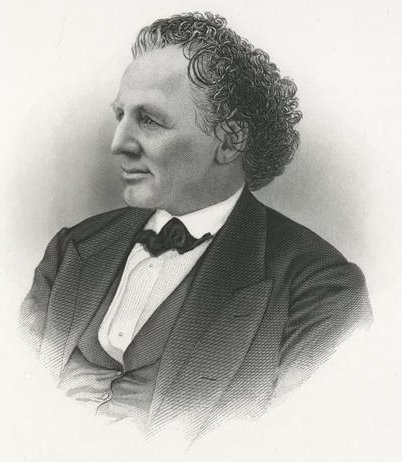
1876 engraving of B.T.Babbitt

Benjamin Talbot Babbitt (May 1, 1809 – October 20, 1889) was a self-made American businessman and inventor who amassed a fortune in the soap industry, manufacturing Babbitt's Best Soap.

== Early life ==
Benjamin Babbitt was born in Westmoreland, New York on May 1, 1809. His parents were Betsey (Holman) Babbitt, and Nathaniel Babbitt, a blacksmith, tavern owner and ensign in the militia of Oneida County, New York. As a child, he attended public school and worked on the family farm. He "possessed a most ingenious and inquiring disposition", and by the time he was twenty he was working in a machine shop and had learned the trades of wheelwright, machinist and file maker. He took an interest in and studied chemistry from a professor who visited the workshop occasionally to give instruction to the workmen.

By age 22 Babbitt had enough money to open his first machine shop in Little Falls, where for 12 years, he manufactured pumps and engines. During this time he invented a practicable and economical mowing machine, one of the first made in America. His business was destroyed by a flood in 1834, but he persevered.

== Manufacturing ==
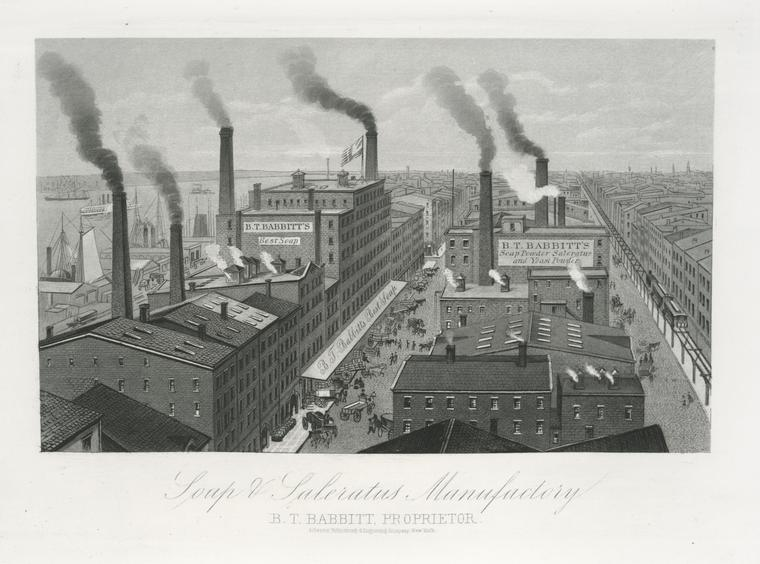
Babbitt's Soap and Saleratus Manufacturing

Babbitt moved to New York City, where he began to manufacture "saleratus" (or sodium bicarbonate, commonly called baking soda). He used a process which he invented, and sold the product in small, convenient and well marked packages. He packaged and marketed his product so well that he quickly controlled most of the sodium bicarbonate market. He started producing a baking powder, a soap powder and several varieties of soap, all of them also successfully marketed well, and very popular. In 1851, he became the first to manufacture and market soap in individual bars, which he packaged attractively and added a claim of quality. He took the ordinary and proved it could be turned into a marketable product. He, along with others like him, helped change American merchandising.

Babbitt invented most of the machinery he used in his production plants. He owned extensive iron works and machine shops in Whitesboro, New York. He held more than 100 patents. In addition to inventions concerning his own field of business, his invention ideas ranged from wind motors, to gun barrels, armor plate, ventilators, steam engine appliances, canal boats and artificial icemakers.

== Advertising ==
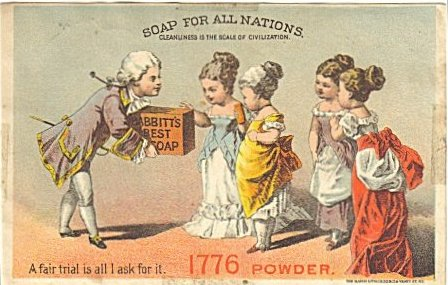
Babbitt's Soap advertisement

Babbitt became known as a genius of advertising. He rivaled his friend P. T. Barnum in originality and success, becoming a household name throughout the U.S.

Babbitt met a young shoeshine boy with the name B. T. Babbitt. When he told the boy his name was also B. T. Babbitt, the surprised boy said, "Lawd mister, did your momma get your name off a soap box too?"

His soap was one of the first nationally advertised products. The soap was sold from brightly painted street cars with musicians, which helped lead the phrase "get on the bandwagon." Babbitt was the first manufacturer to offer tours of his factories and one of the first to give away free samples. He used the advertising slogans, "Soap for all nations" and "Cleanliness is the scale of civilization".

== Embezzlement ==
In the 1870s, Babbitt and his business were embroiled in a major embezzlement case. Two trusted employees were charged and eventually convicted of having stolen some $200,000 to $300,000 from Babbitt over a period of several years. The case attracted extensive public attention.

== Death and legacy ==
Babbitt died October 20, 1889. He was survived by his wife, Rebecca McDuffie Babbitt (1820 - 1894) and his two daughters, Ida Babbitt Hyde and Lillia Babbitt Hyde (1856–1939), to whom he left one half of his $5,000,000 estate as well as the controlling interest in his company. Lillia established The Lillia Babbitt Hyde Foundation in 1924, and served as its president until her death in 1939. The bulk of her estate was left to the Foundation, raising the value of its assets as of June 1941, to approximately $3,200,000.

Sinclair Lewis used the Babbitt family name for the title character of his bestselling novel, Babbitt, about a vulgar and ignorant businessman, written in 1922.

Babbitt is a section of North Bergen, New Jersey named for a tract of 87 acres (35 ha) between Granton and Fairview purchased for factory complex in 1904. to which the soap works relocated in 1907 from its former premises, a 22,000 square feet (2,000 m^{2}) facility on West Street in Lower Manhattan. becoming one of the largest soap manufacturing plants in the world.
