= Northern Branch =

Railway line in New Jersey

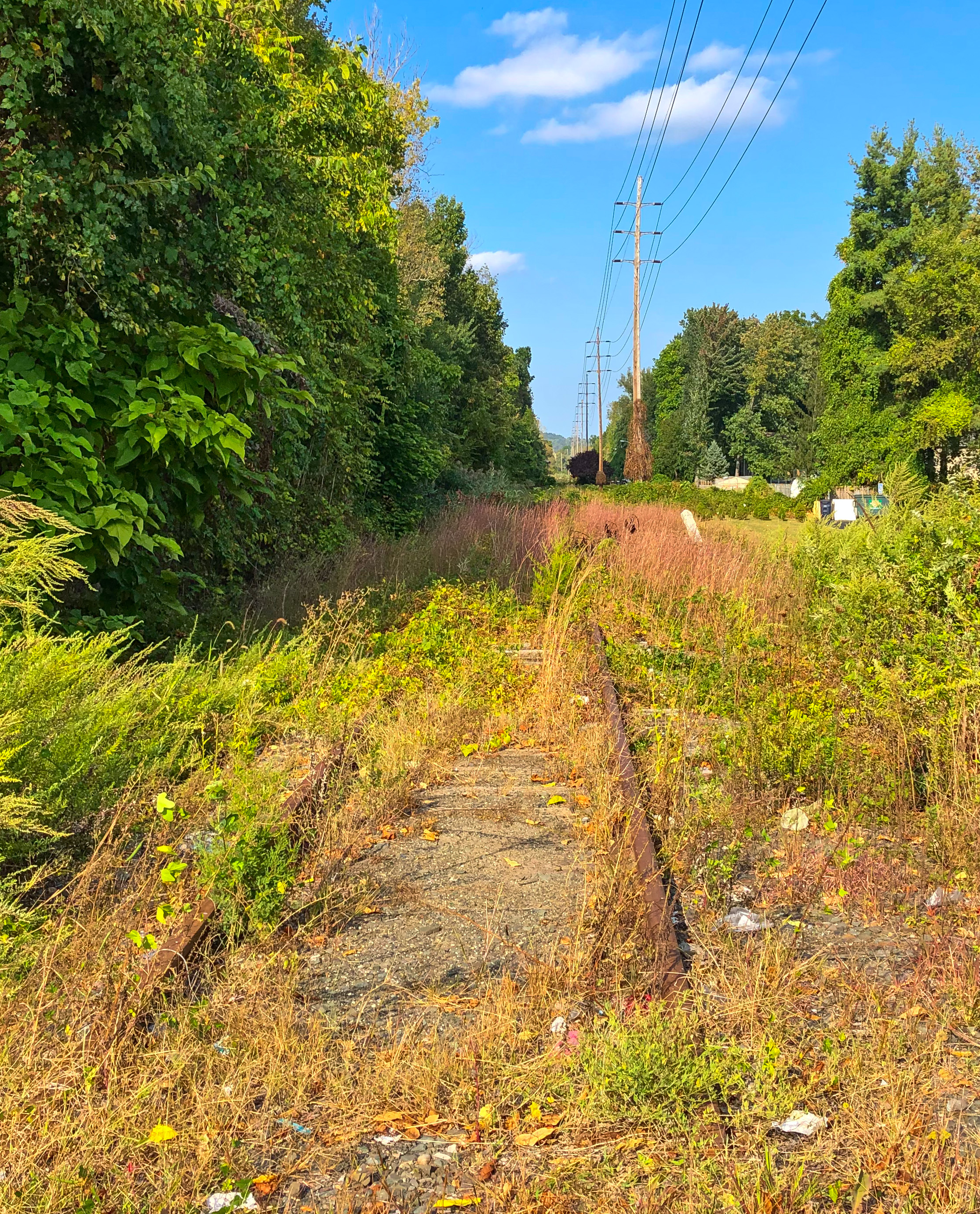
- Northern Branch in Northvale, New Jersey

Overview
- Termini: Jersey City; Northvale (originally to Nyack)

History
- Opened: 1859
- Closed: 1966 (passenger service)

Technical
- Track gauge: 1,435 mm (4 ft 8 1/2 in) standard gauge
- Old gauge: 6 ft (1,829 mm)

The Northern Branch is a railroad line that runs from Jersey City to Northvale in northeastern New Jersey, and formerly extended further into New York State. The line was constructed in 1859 by the Northern Railroad of New Jersey to connect the New York and Erie Railroad's Piermont Branch terminus in Piermont, New York, directly to Erie's primary terminal in Jersey City, initially Exchange Place, later Pavonia Terminal. In 1870 the line was extended to Nyack, New York, and continued to provide passenger service until 1966. After the Erie's unsuccessful merger with the Lackawanna Railroad to form the Erie-Lackawanna, ownership of the line passed into the hands of Conrail upon its formation in 1976 from a number of bankrupt railroads (including the E-L).

The line survives as two separate but connected sections. The Northern Running Track is an approximately two-mile-long freight railroad line in Hudson County, New Jersey. It runs from the Passaic and Harsimus Line at Marion Junction in western Jersey City north to the North Bergen Yard and the CSX Transportation's River Subdivision. North of the rail yard the Northern Branch diverges from the River Subdivision and continues north to the New York state line as a minor spur.

The Northern Branch Corridor Project is a NJ Transit proposal to restore passenger service on the line as an extension of the Hudson–Bergen Light Rail from the current Tonnelle Avenue terminus in North Bergen to Englewood.

== History ==
=== Northern Railroad of New Jersey ===
The Northern Railroad of New Jersey was chartered in 1854. When it opened on May 28, 1859, it was the second railroad in modern Bergen County (following only the Paterson and Hudson River Railroad) with stage connections to Hackensack and other points. The northern terminal was Piermont, New York, on the New York and Erie Rail Road, which had opened in 1841. After running on the Erie for one mile, trains reached the Northern's own line at Sparkill, New York, and ran for 21 miles to another junction with the Erie at Croxton in Jersey City, New Jersey. From there trains ran on the Erie and the New Jersey Railroad for two and a half miles to the terminal later called Exchange Place. Passengers could continue by ferry to Chambers St in Manhattan. Because of its running over the Erie, the Northern was built to the same 6-foot (1.8 m) broad gauge. By September 1859, there were three passenger trains in each direction, with one express running from Piermont to Jersey City in 70 minutes. Sometime in the 1860s the Northern began running service westward from Sparkill on the Erie's Piermont Branch as far as Monsey, New York.

The southern terminal was moved to the Erie's Jersey City Terminal late in 1868, about six months before the Northern Railroad's formal lease to the Erie. At that time the company had six locomotives, 21 passenger and baggage cars, and 30 freight cars. Not long after, a nominally separate company, the Nyack and Northern Railroad, built from Nyack south to meet the Northern at Sparkill, and from its opening in May 1870 Nyack became the northern terminal for most Northern Railroad trains. The Northern track was changed to standard gauge along with the rest of the Erie system in 1878.

For 5 miles (8.0 km) in Hudson County, Croxton to Granton, the New York, Susquehanna and Western Railway ran parallel to the Northern Railroad. Joint stations were constructed between the railroads with platforms on each side. By the time the Susquehanna was leased by the Erie in 1898, the companies operated the parallel section as one multi-track railroad, with the Northern Railroad's tracks used mostly for northbound trains. Although the Erie lease ended in 1940, the track-sharing continued to the late 1950s.

The Northern Railroad was mainly a commuter and local line, with significant freight business only near its southern end. Business dropped off in the 1930s, and in 1942 the company's property was sold off to its long-term lessor, the Erie. From that time it was the Northern Branch.

=== Erie and Erie Lackawanna ===
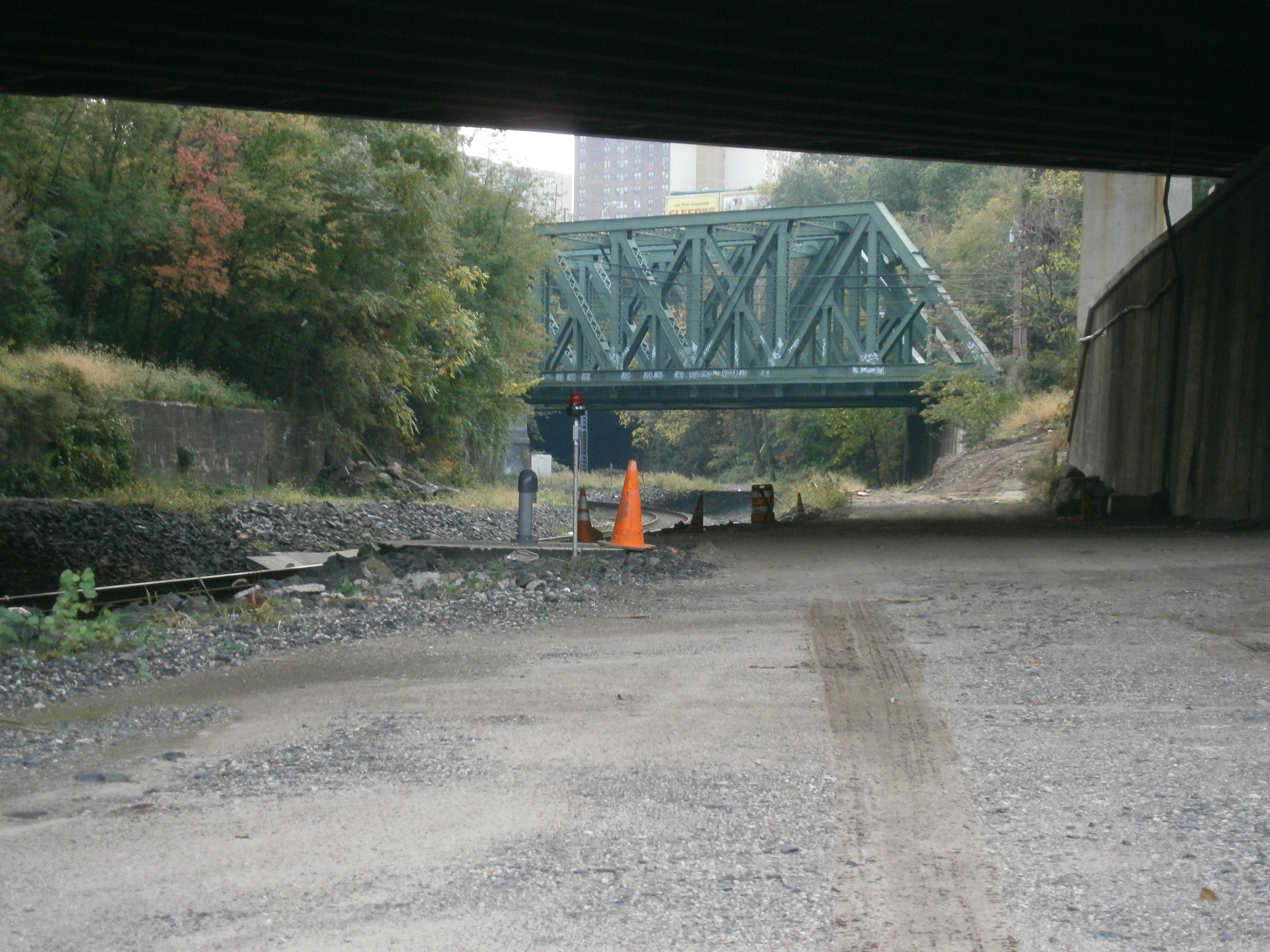
Before re-routing to Hoboken Terminal, Northern Branch trains passed under DL&W bridge near the western portals of the Long Dock Tunnel and later, Bergen Arches.

By 1954, the Northern Branch had only three rush hour passenger trains each way. Between 1956 and 1958, the allied Erie and Delaware, Lackawanna and Western Railroad (DL&W) consolidated their diminishing passenger services at the Lackawanna's Hoboken Terminal. During transition Erie trains continued to use the Erie Pavonia Terminal for about an hour in each rush hour, to distribute the heaviest crowds. A Northern Branch train was the very last to leave Pavonia Erie Terminal in 1958. Two years later, the Pavonia Terminal was razed in 1961. The two companies merged in 1960 to form the Erie-Lackawanna Railroad.

The Northern Branch ran from Hoboken for only eight years. Operation was complicated by the lack of a direct connection. Trains leaving Hoboken had to run out over the new connection (1956) from the DL&W Boonton Branch to the Erie Main Line, pass a switch which would be thrown, back up about two miles on the former route toward the Erie terminal to where the Northern Branch joined the Erie Main, wait for another switch, and then proceed forward again into the Northern Branch. The move added 15 to 20 minutes to running time.

Because commuter services cost more to run than they earned in fares, the Erie-Lackawanna ended passenger service on several branches in 1966. On the Northern Branch, the entire railroad north of Sparkill was abandoned in January and passenger service on the rest of the branch was eliminated in October. The last timetable, April 24, 1966, shows three rush hour trains each way taking 60 minutes to run from Hoboken to Sparkill, only 10 minutes longer than 1954 schedules because of some station closings. Although freight service on the line continued, service into New York state stopped in the late 1970s after the Continental Can Company in Piermont closed.

=== Conrail & CSX ===
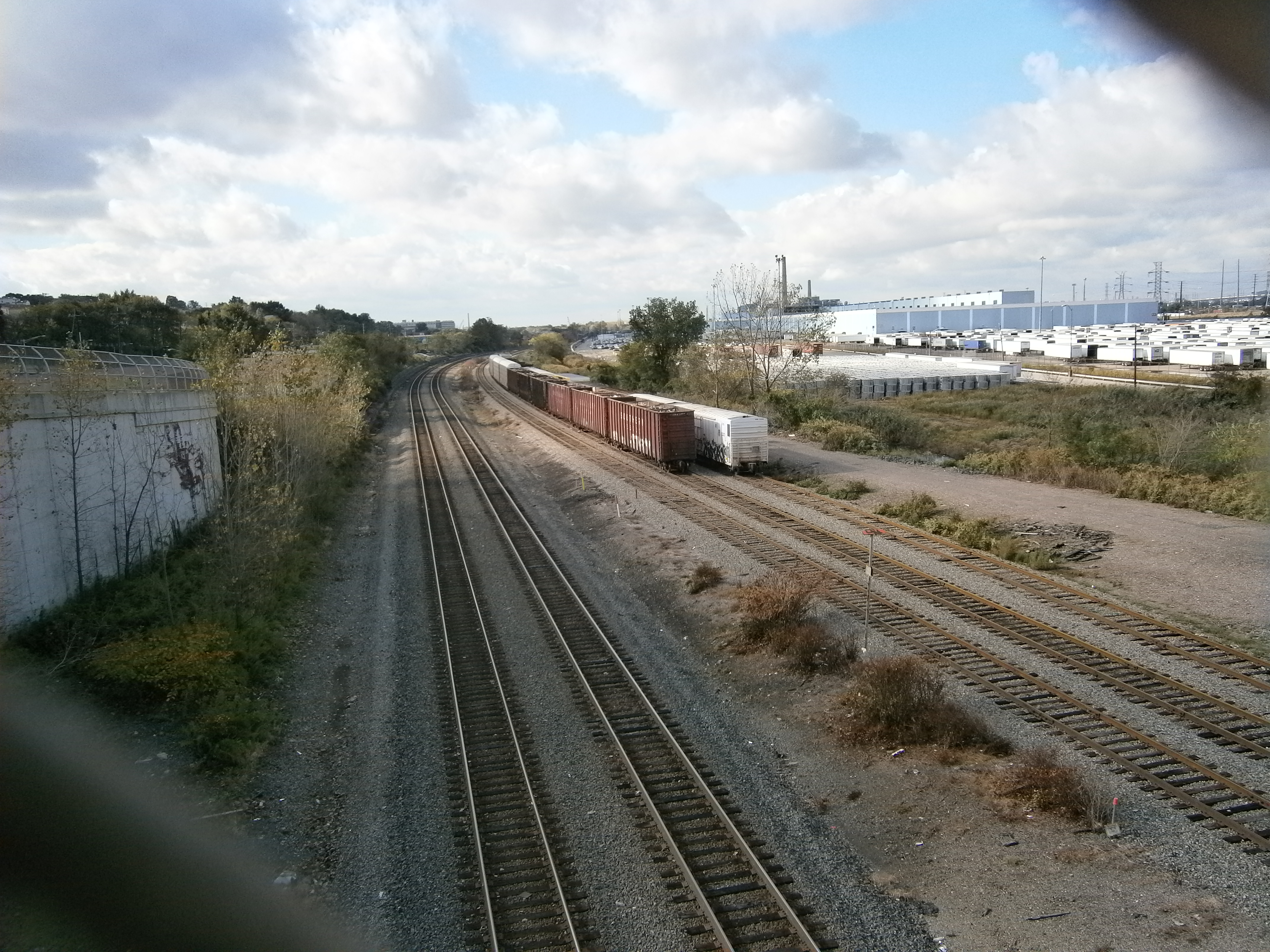
Rebuilt Northern Running Track (left) along ROW where western slope of Bergen Hill descends to the Meadowlands. Parallel line originally developed as Hudson Connecting Railway, now NYS&W.

By the consolidation of Erie Lackawanna and Penn Central (among others) into Conrail in 1976, both the West Shore Railroad and the Northern Branch fell under the control of Conrail. As trains accessing the Northern Branch in Jersey City had to go to Journal Square and reverse direction, and the connection included a grade crossing of Newark Avenue, freight trains typically used the New Jersey Junction Railroad and West Shore Railroad, renamed as Conrail's River Line, to go through northern New Jersey.

Around 1994, a short elevated track, known as the Marion Running Track, was built to connect the Passaic and Harsimus Line towards Kearny with the Northern Branch. This provided the Northern Branch with a direct connection to other lines heading west and south at Marion Junction.

After the breakup of Conrail in 1999, the Northern Branch was divided. Conrail Shared Assets Operations retained the tracks from Marion Junction to the CSX yard in North Bergen, known as the Northern Running Track. CSX was given the remaining section north to Northvale, in addition to the West Shore Railroad running through the yard, known as the Bergen Subdivision of the River Line.

With New Jersey Transit's 2000 creation of the Hudson–Bergen Light Rail on the River Line east of the CSX North Bergen Yard, freight trains needed an alternate route to get to the CSX Albany Division. Trains were re-routed via the Northern Running Track to access the Bergen Subdivision and this part of the Northern Branch became major CSX rail corridor from Upstate New York. At that time, the Northern Running Track was improved to handle the heavier traffic that had formerly used the River Line on the east side of the New Jersey Palisades. New Jersey Transit paid for the project, which included double-tracking the line, changing Marion Junction and Bergen Junction, and building overpasses on Secaucus Road and Paterson Plank Road. The rest of the Northern Branch continues north to the New York state line, and is a minor spur.

== Route guide ==
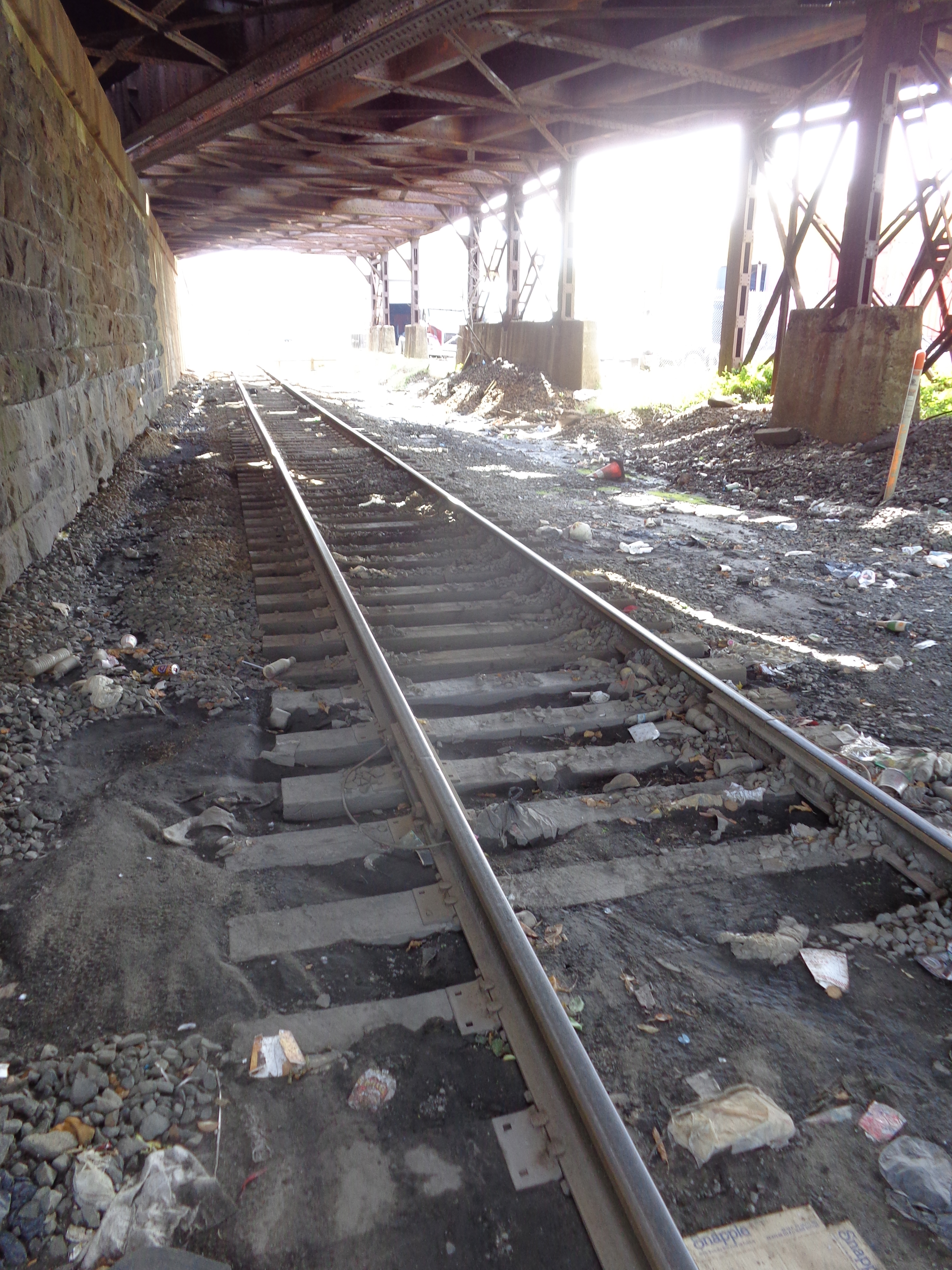
Northern Branch passes under the River Line at Babbitt, North Bergen

The Marion Running Track is a short elevated track connecting the Passaic and Harsimus Line towards Kearny with the Northern Branch. It was built around 1994; prior to its opening, trains accessing the Northern Branch had to go to Journal Square and reverse direction, and the connection included a grade crossing of Newark Avenue (which the new connection overpasses). For these reasons, most freight trains instead used the River Line, passing through the Palisades in tunnels twice.

Another grade crossing still exists at Saint Paul's Avenue, under the Pulaski Skyway and Truck US 1-9. This is now the only grade crossing on the Northern Running Track. Just north of this crossing, a second track begins; the line is double-tracked from here to the north end.

North of there, the line passes under the former Delaware, Lackawanna and Western Railroad, now part of New Jersey Transit's Hoboken Division in the middle of West End Junction. These bridges were built in 1907, before which the tracks crossed at grade.

Just north of the NJ Transit overpasses, the line enters Bergen Junction, and two tracks split to the west from the main line, which heads northwest to Croxton Yard.

Soon the line passes over County Road on a rather old bridge. It then passes under Secaucus Road, whose bridge opened on May 20, 2002. The New York, Susquehanna and Western Railway begins at the Land Bridge Terminal, just north of Secaucus Road, and parallels the Northern Running Track, just to the west, all the way to its end.

The next three overpasses, over which pass the Northeast Corridor, Route 3, and Route 495, have never been grade crossings. The next overpass, Paterson Plank Road, opened on April 22, 2002.

The Northern Running Track ends at North Bergen Yard, at what has been called Granton Junction, and is now CP 2. From here, it splits into two CSX lines, the Bergen Subdivision (which was part of Conrail's River Line until most of Conrail's assets were split), and CSX's Northern Branch. The Bergen Subdivision soon becomes the River Subdivision, and leads along the west side of the Hudson River towards Albany, New York.

Beginning at CP 2, the CSX-owned Northern Branch is a lightly used freight spur that passes through eastern Bergen County, New Jersey, terminating at the state line in Northvale. The line's tracks have been removed beginning at the New York border. However, the right-of-way continues as a rail trail heading north as several names - the Joseph B. Clarke Rail-Trail to Piermont, the Old Erie Path to Grand View, and the Raymond G. Esposito Trail to Nyack. There are proposals to use the right-of-way north of Englewood, New Jersey the state line as a rail trail connecting to the Hudson River Valley Greenway.

== Future passenger use ==
New Jersey Transit plans to restore passenger service over a portion of the CSX line between North Bergen and Englewood as an extension of the Hudson–Bergen Light Rail from Tonnelle Avenue, known as the Northern Branch Corridor Project.

== See also ==
- Hudson Connecting Railway
- Timeline of Jersey City area railroads
