= Tonnelle Avenue station =

Light rail station in New Jersey, US

Tonnelle Avenue
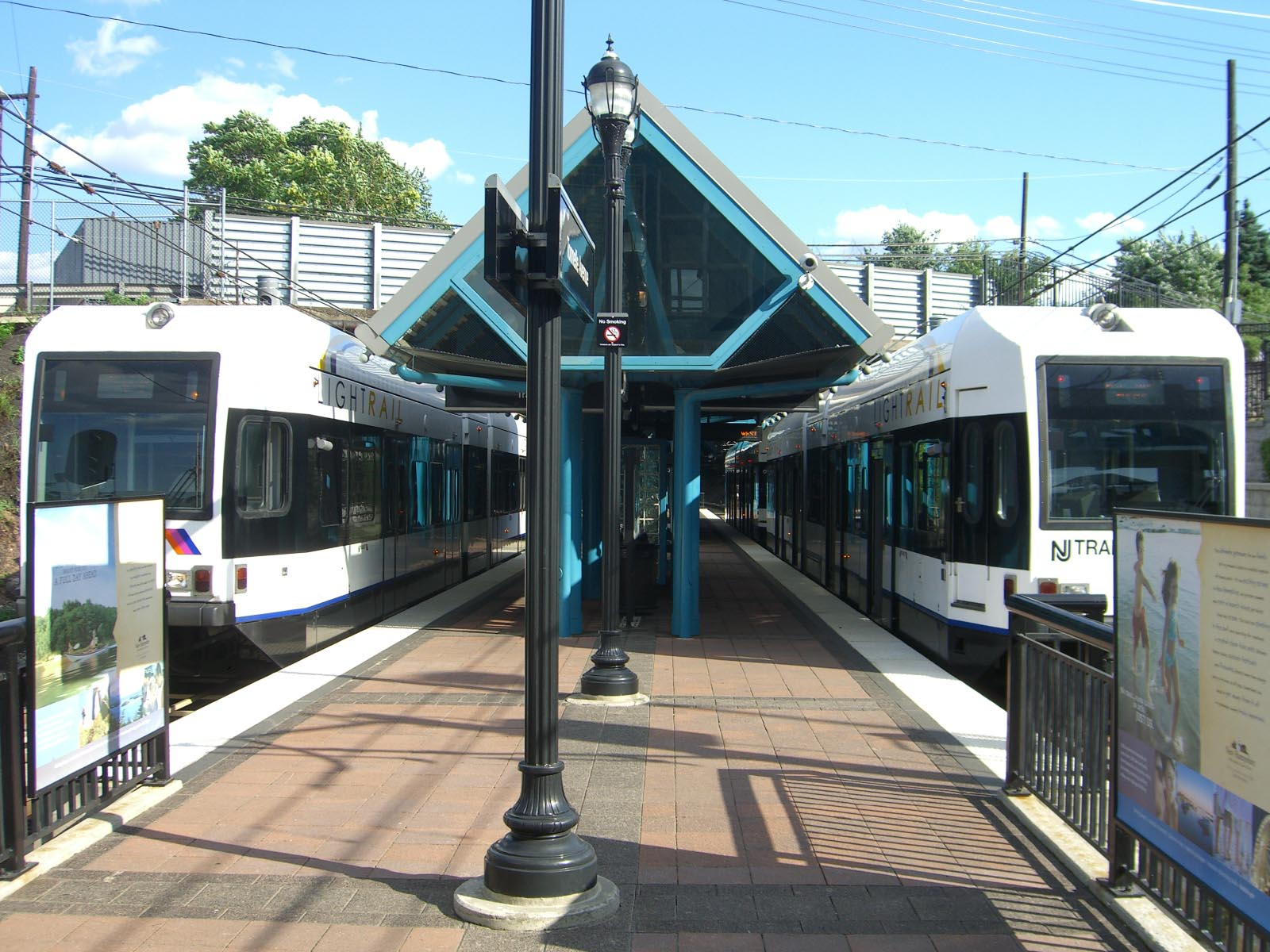
- Tonnelle Avenue station platform

General information
- Location: Tonnelle Avenue (US 1/9) at 49th Street; North Bergen, New Jersey
- Coordinates: 40°47′14″N 74°01′52″W
- Owner: New Jersey Transit
- Platforms: 1 island platform
- Tracks: 2
- Connections: NJ Transit Bus: 83, 127

Construction
- Parking: 682 spaces, 17 accessible spaces
- Cycle facilities: Yes
- Accessible: Yes

Other information
- Fare zone: 1

History
- Opened: February 25, 2006

Passengers
- 2025: 1,087(average weekday)
- Rank: 22 of 23

Services
Preceding station	NJ Transit	Following station
Bergenline Avenue toward West Side Avenue	West Side–Tonnelle	Terminus
Bergenline Avenue toward Hoboken	Hoboken–Tonnelle	Terminus
Proposed services
Preceding station	NJ Transit	Following station
Bergenline Avenue toward West Side Avenue	West Side–Tonnelle Northern Branch	69th Street toward Englewood Hospital
Bergenline Avenue toward Hoboken	Hoboken–Tonnelle Northern Branch	69th Street toward Englewood Hospital
Terminus	Passaic–Bergen–Hudson Transit (TBD)	69th Street toward Hawthorne
Location

Tonnelle Avenue station (pronounced /tɒnəli/) is an active light rail station in the township of North Bergen, Hudson County, New Jersey. Located at the junction of Tonnelle Avenue (U.S. Route 1/9) and 49th Street, the station serves as the northern terminus of the Hudson–Bergen Light Rail (HBLR), servicing trains on its West Side–Tonnelle and Hoboken–Tonnelle services from West Side Avenue station in Jersey City and Hoboken Terminal in Hoboken. Tonnelle Avenue station consists of a single island platform with two tracks and a 730-space park and ride lot accessible via 49th Street. A small yard and a loop are present west of the station.

Service at Tonnelle Avenue began on February 25, 2006 as part of an extension of the HBLR from Port Imperial station in Weehawken along with Bergenline Avenue station. A proposed extension continues as part of the Northern Branch Corridor Project, which would bring the line to Englewood in Bergen County.
