= Hawthorne station (NJ Transit) =

NJ Transit rail station

Hawthorne
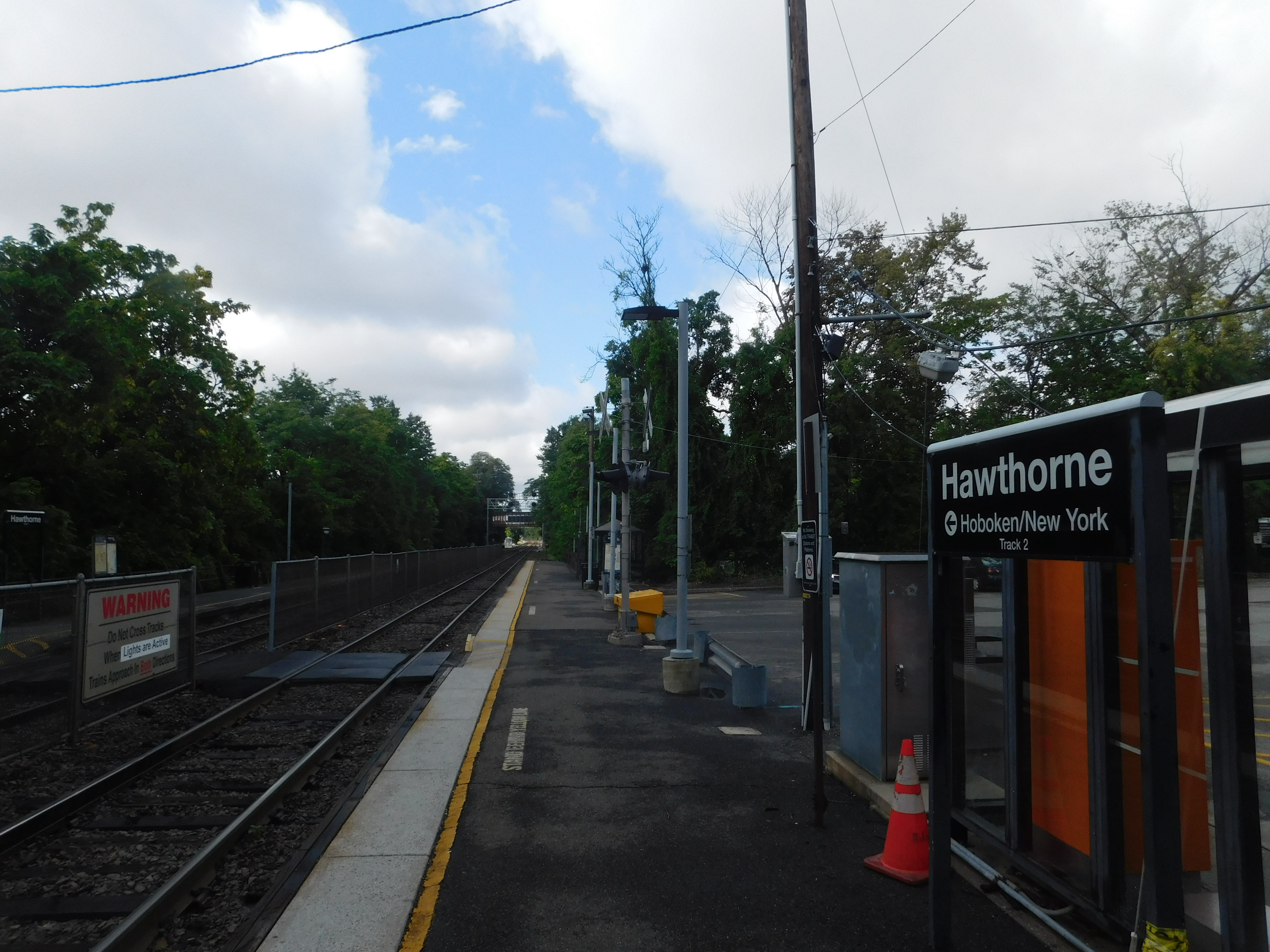
- Hawthorne station in August 2026.

General information
- Location: 5 Washington Avenue (on Washington Place), Hawthorne, Passaic County, New Jersey 07506
- Coordinates: 40.9427°N 74.1525°W
- Owner: New Jersey Transit
- Platforms: 2 side platforms
- Tracks: 2
- Connections: NJT Bus: 722

Construction
- Parking: 139 spaces

Other information
- Station code: 2307 (Erie Railroad)
- Fare zone: 7

History
- Opened: October 19, 1848
- Rebuilt: September 14, 1949–January 19, 1950
- Electrified: Not electrified
- Former names: Van Blarcoms; Norwood

Passengers
- 2025: 360 (average weekday)
- Rank: 76 of 153

Services
Preceding station	NJ Transit	Following station
Glen Rock–Main Line toward Suffern	Main Line	Paterson toward Hoboken
Former services
Preceding station	Erie Railroad	Following station
Ferndale toward Ridgewood	Main Line local stops	River Street toward Jersey City
Proposed services
Preceding station	NJ Transit	Following station
6th Avenue toward Tonnelle Avenue	Passaic–Bergen–Hudson Transit (TBD)	Terminus
Location

Hawthorne is an active commuter railroad station operated by New Jersey Transit in the borough of Hawthorne, Passaic County, New Jersey, United States. It is the northernmost station in Passaic County along New Jersey Transit's Main Line. Trains coming through Hawthorne service Waldwick, Suffern and Port Jervis to the north and Hoboken Terminal to the south, where connections are available to New York City via Port Authority Trans-Hudson and ferries. The station, accessible only by Washington Place in Hawthorne, contains only two low-level platforms connected by a grade crossing. As a result, the station is not compliant with the Americans with Disabilities Act of 1990.

== History ==
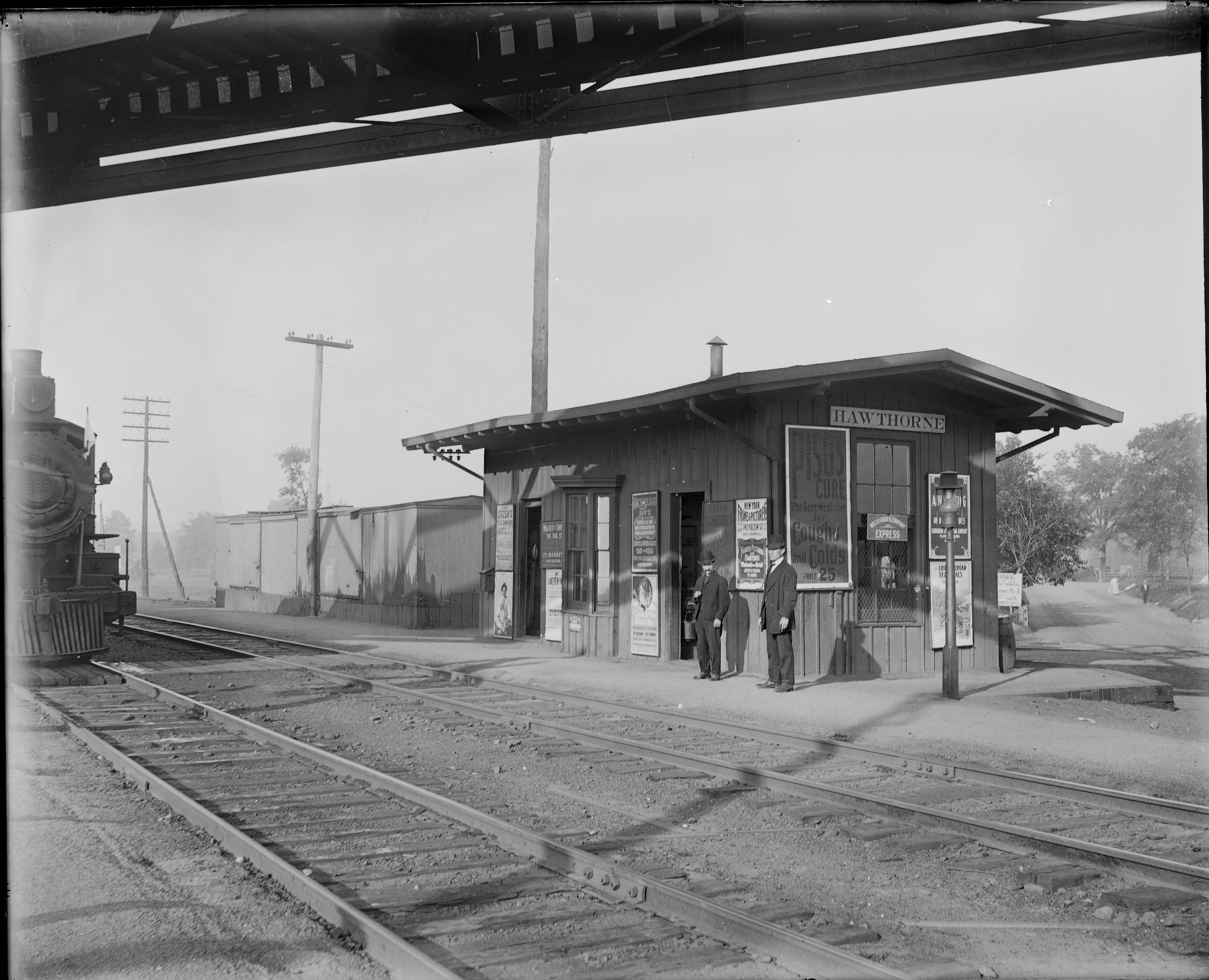
The former Hawthorne depot at the Wagaraw Road grade crossing

Railroad service to what was then Manchester Township began on October 19, 1848, with the opening of the Paterson and Ramapo Railroad, a railroad connecting the Paterson and Hudson River Railroad from Paterson. The railroad went through Bergen County and connected to the New York, Lake Erie and Western Railroad at Suffern. At that time the stop in Manchester Township was known as Van Blarcoms and located closer to the crossing of Wagaraw Road (County Route 504). The station was renamed Norwood, but the United States Postal Service requested a change because the name was the same as the already existing Norwood in Bergen County.

In July 1948, proposals came to replace the station at Hawthorne, built in 1863, because of the elimination of the Wagaraw Road grade crossing. The new 37-by-20-foot (11.3 m × 6.1 m) brick station would cost $30,000 (1948 USD). Groundbreaking for the new station and Wagaraw Road crossing occurred on September 14, 1949, and the Erie shifted to the new depot on January 19, 1950. The Erie Railroad received permission on June 9, 1966 to eliminate the agent at Hawthorne station.

== Station layout and services ==
The station platforms are not adjacent to any through road in Hawthorne.

- The northbound platform is located near Vincent Avenue, but the platform is not accessible from that street. The station's parking lot is located off the corner of Washington Street and Washington Avenue
- The southbound platform main entrance is from the station parking lot. A secondary entrance is on a dead-end street, Washington Place.
- Ticket machines are at the main entrance to the southbound platform (at the parking lot).
- A grade crossing connects the two platforms adjacent to the parking lot, i.e., a pedestrian can walk through the lot, enter the southbound platform, and immediately cross both the platform and the rails to reach the northbound platform. There are railway crossing signals at this pedestrian crossing, similar to those at street crossings, to allow for safe passage.

Hawthorne station is to be one of two terminus points on the proposed (but dormant) Passaic-Bergen Rail Line plan, a light-rail system that will run from Hawthorne through Paterson, Elmwood Park, and Hackensack.

The station has two tracks, each with a low-level side platform.

== See also ==
- Passaic–Bergen–Hudson Transit Project
