= Englewood Hospital and Medical Center =

Englewood Health
- Englewood Health

Geography
- Location: 350 Engle Street; Englewood, NJ 07631; U.S.
- Coordinates: 40°54′18″N 73°58′02″W

Organisation
- Type: Teaching

Services
- Emergency department: Yes
- Beds: 294

History
- Founded: 1890

Links
- Website: www.englewoodhealth.org

Englewood Health is a nonprofit healthcare system based in Englewood, New Jersey, United States. The system provides inpatient and outpatient care through Englewood Hospital and an integrated network of physician practices, urgent care centers, imaging facilities, and outpatient locations across Bergen, Hudson, Passaic, Essex, and Morris counties.

Englewood Health operates more than 100 locations and delivers medical and surgical services through its hospital and the Englewood Health Physician Network, a primary care and specialty physician network serving communities in northern New Jersey.

== Clinical services ==
Englewood Health offers services including cardiac surgery and cardiovascular care, cancer care, orthopedic surgery, spine surgery, vascular surgery, women's health, diagnostic and breast imaging, bloodless medicine and surgery, and robotic surgery. Care is provided through Englewood Hospital and affiliated outpatient facilities throughout northern New Jersey.

== Englewood Hospital ==
Englewood Hospital opened in 1890. It is a community teaching hospital with 294 beds.

The hospital supports graduate medical education through fellowship programs in vascular surgery and breast oncology surgery, as well as residency programs in dentistry, internal medicine, nursing, pharmacy, and podiatry. Additional training programs are offered in radiography, emergency medical services, and other allied health disciplines.

In 2024, the hospital reported 2,888 births.

== Physician Network ==
The Englewood Health Physician Network includes primary care physicians and specialists practicing across multiple outpatient sites. The network supports coordinated care across inpatient, outpatient, urgent care, and diagnostic settings.

== Organization and finances ==
As of 2024, Englewood Health employed more than 4,500 people. The health system reported total operating revenue of $1.19 billion and provided $92.6 million in charity care during the same year.

== Awards and recognition ==
Englewood Hospital has received national recognition for quality and safety.

The hospital has received an "A" Hospital Safety Grade from The Leapfrog Group multiple times since 2012 and was named a Top Teaching Hospital by the organization in 2025.

In 2026, Englewood Hospital was included in Newsweek's list of Best-in-State Hospitals.

U.S. News & World Report ranked Englewood Hospital among the Best Regional Hospitals for 2025–2026.
