= Marion Junction (New Jersey) =

Coordinates: 40.737665°N 74.07372°W

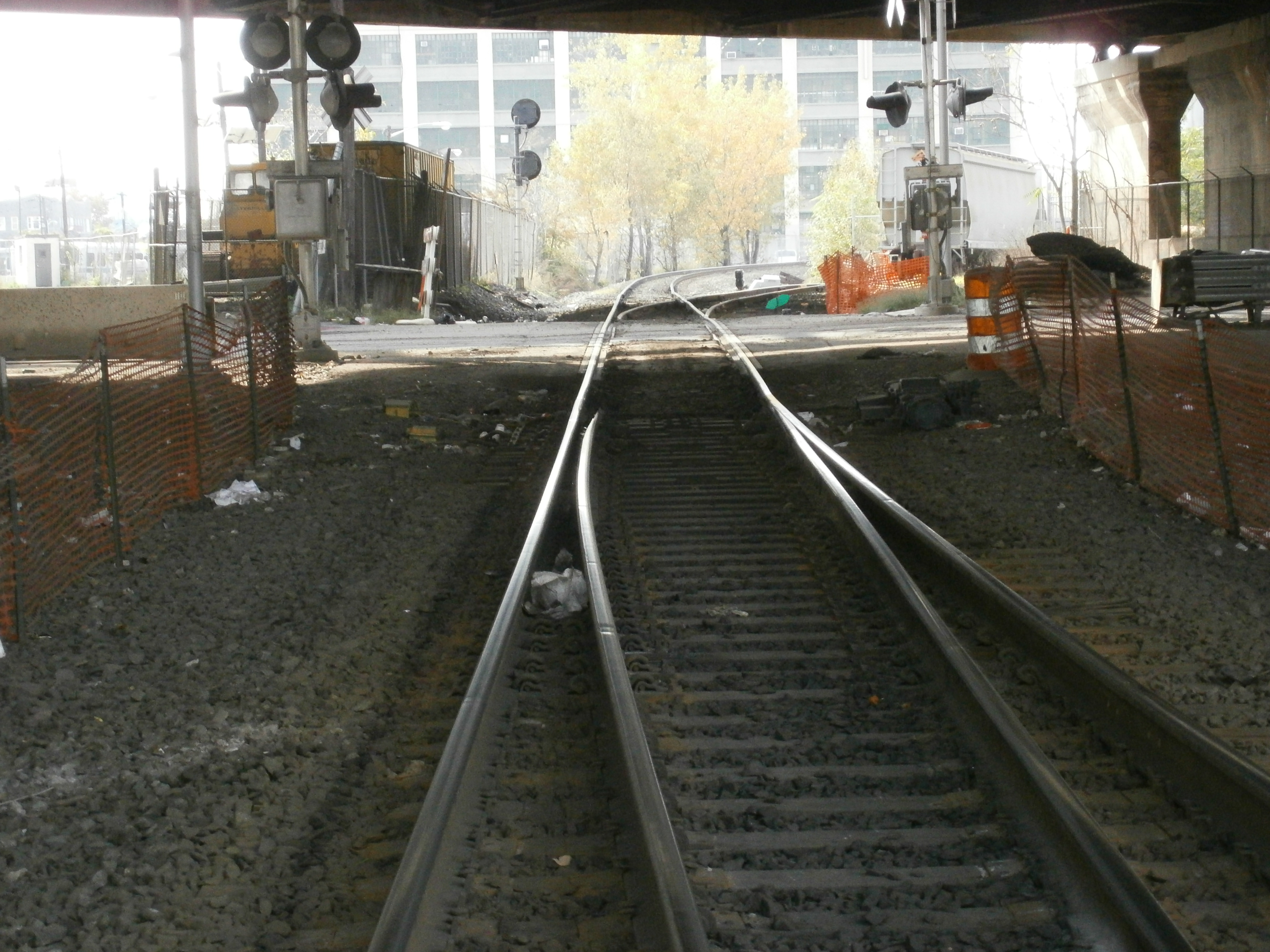
Running track under the Pulaski Skyway connects to the Passaic and Harsimus Line and Northern Branch at Marion Junction. ROW previously also connected to Bergen Hill Cut and Exchange Place

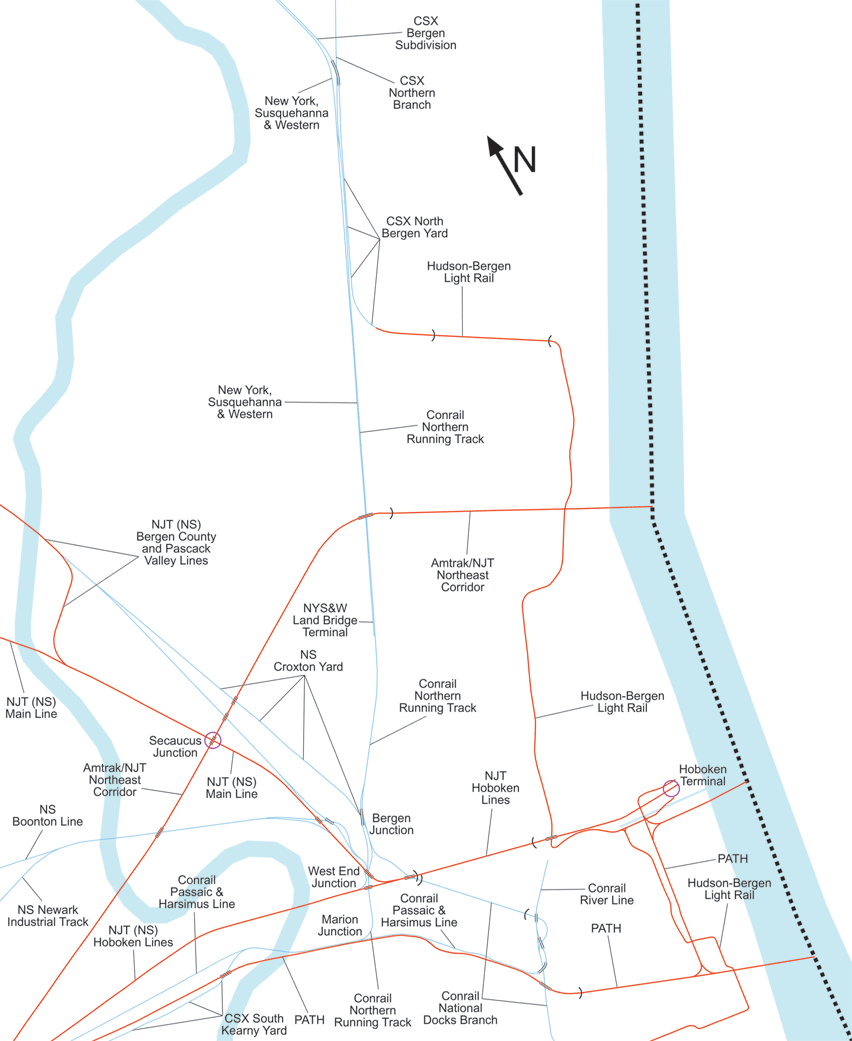
A map of Marion Junction and connecting railroads. Marion Junction is labeled near the bottom center of the map, just south of the West End Junction.

Marion Junction is a railroad junction in western Jersey City, New Jersey. Currently, it connects CSX's River Line (via Conrail's Northern Branch) to Conrail's Passaic and Harsimus Line. The two lines merge towards the west, allowing through trains from upstate New York to continue towards the rest of the country. The track actually making the connection is known as the Marion Running Track.

== History ==
The New Jersey Railroad (NJRR; later part of the Pennsylvania Railroad, PRR) and Paterson and Hudson River Railroad (later part of the Erie Railroad) both built their lines to this point in 1834 and November 28, 1833, respectively. It took four more years for the NJRR to cut through Bergen Hill, or the lower New Jersey Palisades; prior to that, passengers and freight transferred to horse-drawn carriages over the hill. The junction was a simple one, with both lines merging towards the east, allowing both railroads to access the east side of the Palisades and the Hudson River.

In 1861, due to congestion on the PRR cut, the Erie built the Long Dock Tunnel through Bergen Hill and Marion Junction became a minor transfer point. In 1873 the newly opened New York, Susquehanna and Western Railway (NYS&W) and Montclair Railway (later New York and Greenwood Lake Railway, NY&GL) began using trackage rights over the Erie route to Marion Junction in order to reach the PRR cut. NY&GL rerouted passenger trains to the Erie's Pavonia Terminal about 1890, and NYS&W did the same in 1911. NYS&W continued to maintain a freight house at Marion Junction.

With the decline of the passenger railroads in the mid-20th century, Marion Junction lost much traffic. Facing east, it was not in the best alignment for freight traffic between upstate New York and points south.

Around 1994, New Jersey Transit paid to modify the junction to point west, as part of moving the River Line to the west side of the Palisades, clearing the east side for the Hudson-Bergen Light Rail. This made the junction the preferred (and in some cases the only) route for freight traffic.

== See also ==
- Hudson Connecting Railway
- Croxton, Jersey City
- Long Dock Tunnel
- List of New Jersey railroad junctions
