= New Jersey Junction Railroad =

American railway from 1886 to 1952

Overview
- Headquarters: Weehawken, New Jersey
- Locale: Hudson River shore in New Jersey
- Dates of operation: 1886–1952

Technical
- Track gauge: 4 ft 8 1/2 in (1,435 mm) standard gauge

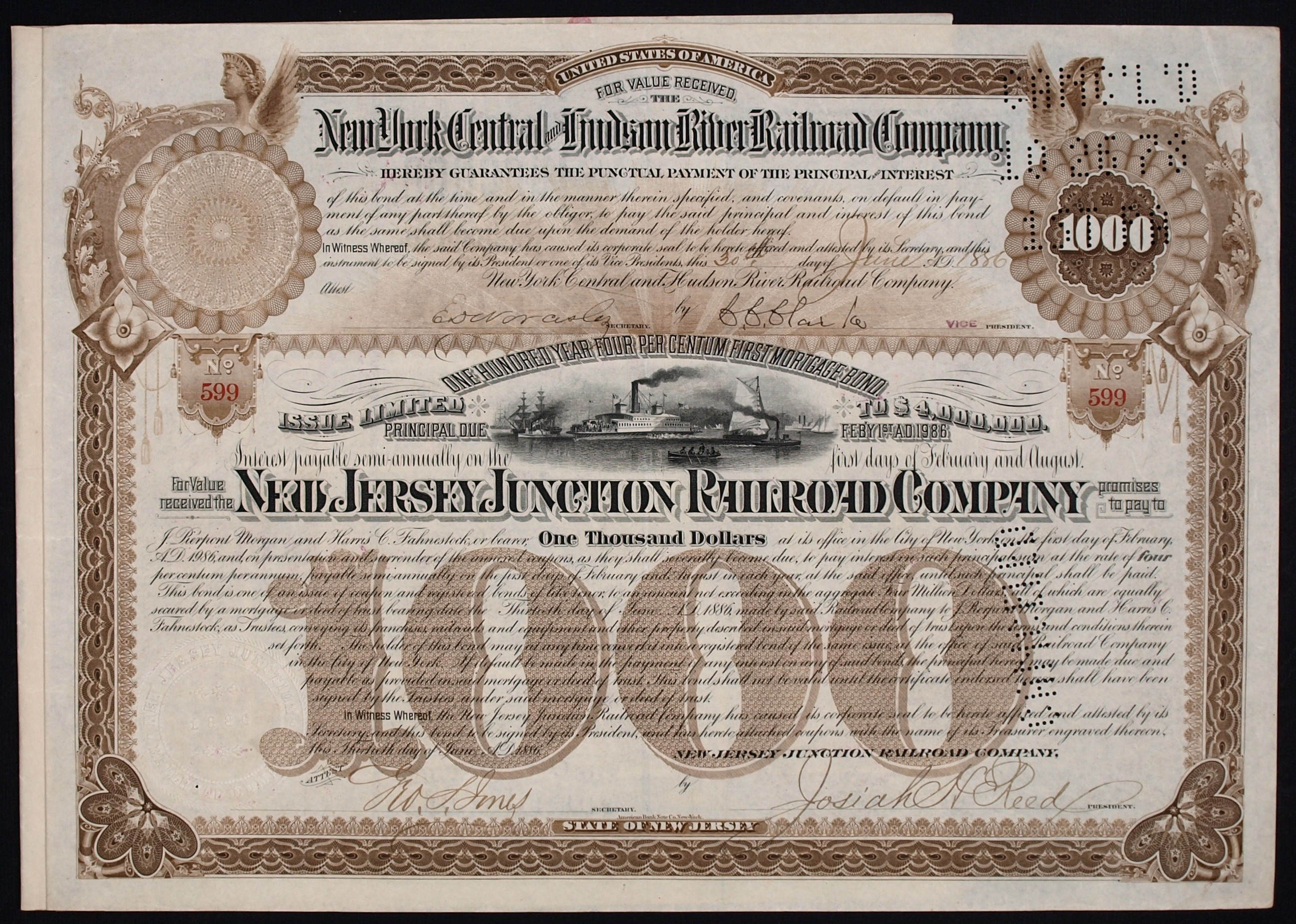
Bond of the New Jersey Junction Railroad Company, issued 30. June 1886

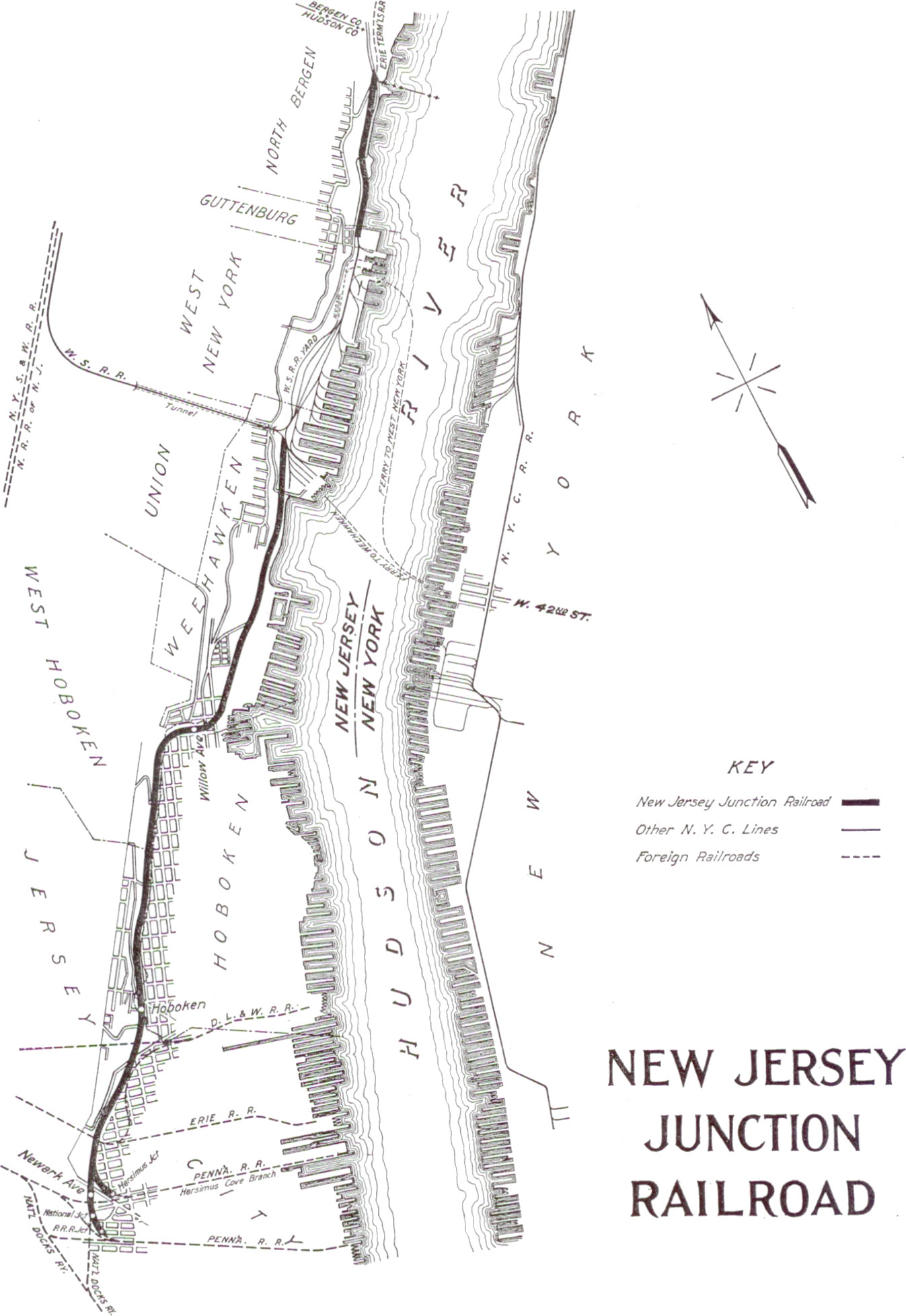
A 1921 map of the New Jersey Junction Railroad.

The New Jersey Junction Railroad (NJJ) was part of the New York Central Railroad and ran along the Hudson River in Hudson County, New Jersey, from the West Shore Railroad (NYCRR) yards at Weehawken Terminal south to Jersey City. It later owned an extension to the north, separated by the Weehawken yard from the original line.

What would become part of the NJJ was the Hoboken and Hudson River Turnpike, chartered in 1857 to build a road from the north of Hoboken to Bull's Ferry near the Bergen County line. The New York and Bull's Ferry Railroad was chartered in 1861, and renamed the New York and Fort Lee Railroad the year after. This railroad had been projected by the Erie Railroad as a much larger line, stretching from Hoboken to the New York state line along the Hudson River. The first two miles of this projected road, built on part of the Hoboken and Hudson River Railroad from Jersey City to the north side of Hoboken, opened in 1870, and was controlled by the Erie from the outset. The connection to the Long Dock Tunnel was made by way of the Morris and Essex Railroad; when they abandoned their line in favour of using the Bergen Tunnels, the Fort Lee assumed control of the connection to the tunnel. By the end of its life, the road reached the Township of Union.

With the opening of the Weehawken Tunnel by the NYCRR in 1884, the NYCRR began to expand their reach through Hudson County. The NJJ was incorporated under the laws of New Jersey on February 27, 1886. The New York and Fort Lee was leased to the New Jersey Junction Railroad on June 30, 1886. With the exception of the connection to the Long Dock Tunnel (which would become the Docks Connecting Railway), most of its trackage was transferred to the NJJ, though south of Weehawken the NJJ constructed new trackage parallel to the existing line to allow the Erie to reach its Weehawken yards under lease. On July 1, 1886, the NJJ was leased for 100 years to the New York Central and Hudson River Railroad. The full line south to the Pennsylvania Railroad's lines in Jersey City opened for freight in May 1887 and passengers in June 1887.

The NJJ owned the entire stock of the New Jersey Shore Line Railroad, Jersey City and Bayonne Railroad, and State Line and Stony Point Railroad; only the former constructed track, subsuming what remained of the Hudson River Turnpike. On October 24, 1914, the NJJ was reorganized as a merger with the New Jersey Shore Line Railroad.

In 1952, the New York Central Railroad officially subsumed the New Jersey Junction Railroad, which it had controlled since its beginning. The line eventually passed under control of CSX and Norfolk Southern as their River Line and Weehawken Branch. The southern section is now being used for New Jersey Transit's Hudson-Bergen Light Rail, from North Bergen south to Hoboken, with freight now running along the former Northern Railroad of New Jersey on the other side of the New Jersey Palisades.

== See also ==
- River Line (Conrail)
- Timeline of Jersey City area railroads
