= Timeline of Jersey City, New Jersey =

Coordinates: 40.711417°N 74.06476°W

The following is a timeline of the history of Jersey City, New Jersey, United States.

== 19th century ==
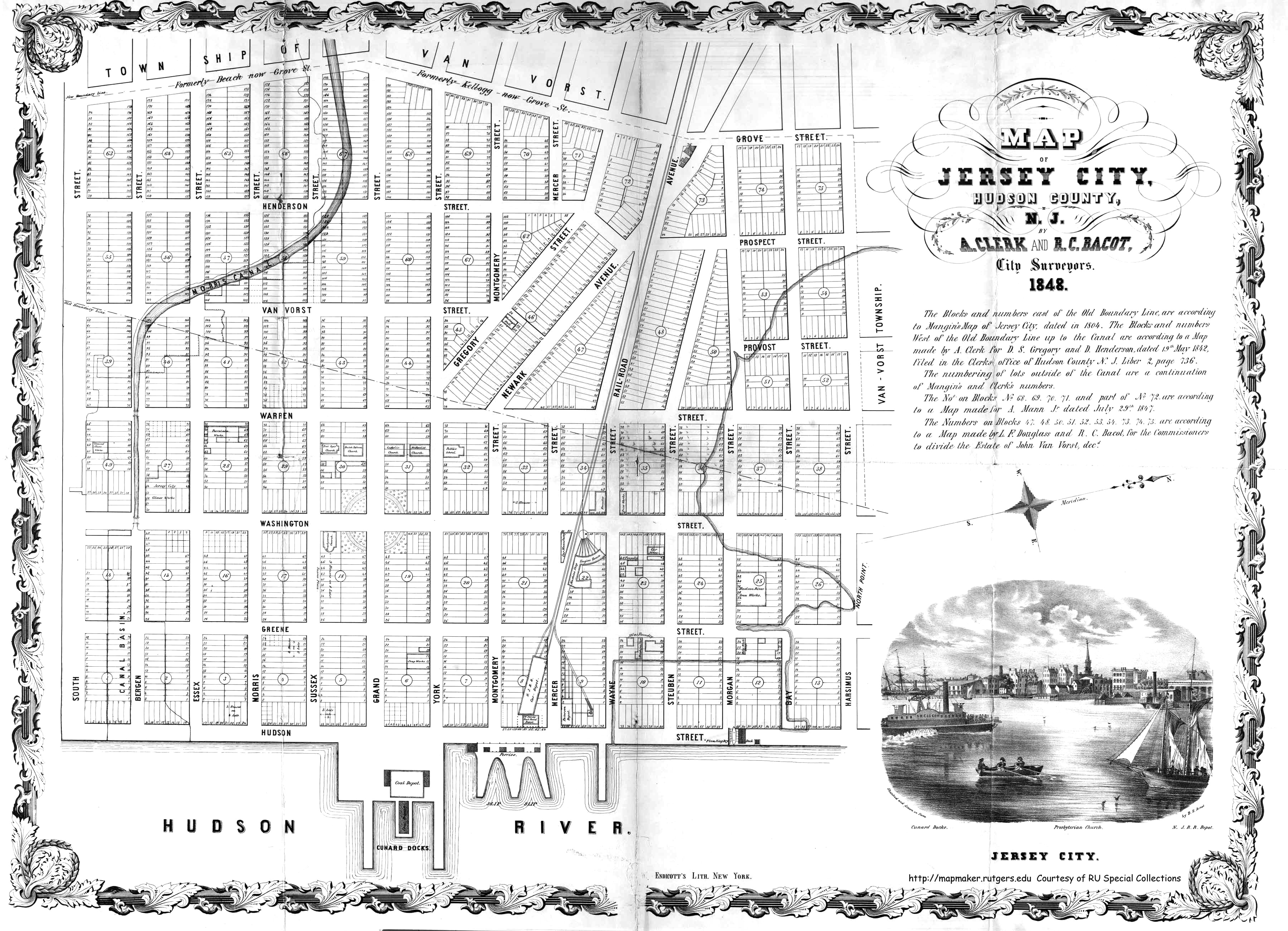
Map of Jersey City, New Jersey, 1848

- 1802 - Population of Paulus Hook: 13.
- 1804
  - Land bought from Cornelius Van Vorst by the Associates of the Jersey Company.
  - Streets of the Hook laid out.
- 1812 - Steam ferry begins operating.
- 1820 - "City of Jersey" incorporated in Bergen Township.
- 1824 - Jersey Glass Company established.
- 1825 - Jersey Porcelain and Earthenware Company incorporated.
- 1833 - American Pottery Manufacturing Company in business.
- 1834
  - New Jersey Railroad terminal and Paterson and Hudson River Railroad terminal established.
  - Newark-Jersey City horsecar begins operating.
- 1835 - Jersey City Gazette newspaper begins publication.
- 1836 - Morris Canal in operation.
- 1838 - City renamed "Jersey City."
- 1840 - City becomes part of Hudson County.
- 1847
  - Jersey City Telegraph newspaper begins publication.
  - Dixon Mills and Colgate & Company soap factory built.
- 1850 - Population: 6,856.
- 1851 - Van Vorst Township becomes part of city.
- 1853 - Grace Church Van Vorst built.
- 1856 - Taylor's Hotel in business.
- 1860 - Population: 29,227.
- 1862 - Breusing florists in business.
- 1867
  - Lincoln Association founded.
  - Evening Journal newspaper begins publication.
- 1868
  - Hudson County Volksblatt German-language newspaper begins publication (approximate date).
  - Hudson City Savings Bank established.
- 1869 - Bruckner's Variety Store in business.

=== 1870s-1890s ===
- 1870
  - Hudson City and Bergen City become part of Jersey City.
  - St. John's Episcopal Church built.
  - Population: 82,546.
  - Lorillard Tobacco Company relocates to Jersey City.
- 1872 - Law Library Association founded.
- 1872- Saint Peter's College founded
- 1873 - Greenville becomes part of Jersey City.
- 1874
  - Abattoir and stockyards in operation.
  - Jersey City Drug and Spice Mills in business.
- 1876
  - Aesthetic Society formed.
  - Centennial of American independence.
- 1887 - Pavonia Terminal opens.
- 1889
  - Free Public Library established.
  - Central Railroad of New Jersey Terminal built.
- 1890 - Population: 163,003.
- 1893
  - Svoboda Ukrainian-language newspaper begins publication.
  - Hasbrouck Institute opens.
- 1900
  - Great Atlantic and Pacific Tea Company Warehouse built.
  - Population: 206,433.

== 20th century ==
- 1901
  - Little Russian Greek Catholic Church of St. Peter and Paul built.
  - American Type Founders headquartered in city.
- 1904 - People's Palace established.
- 1905 - West Side Park opens.
- 1906 - Colgate Clock installed.
- 1907 - Block Drug Company established.
- 1908 - Głos Narodu Polish-language newspaper in publication (approximate date).
- 1909 - Hudson Tubes begin operating to Manhattan.
- 1910 - Population: 267,779.
- 1912 - Lincoln High School established.
- 1922 - Hudson Jewish News begins publication.
- 1925
  - Journal Square laid out.
  - Mary Teresa Norton becomes U.S. representative for New Jersey's 12th congressional district.
- 1927 - Holland Tunnel opens to Lower Manhattan.
- 1929 - New Jersey State Normal School at Jersey City and Loew's Jersey Theatre opens.
- 1930 - Population: 316,715.
- 1937 - Jersey City Giants baseball team formed.
- 1951 - Carpathian Star newspaper begins publication.
- 1974 - Hudson County Community College established.
- 1980
  - Novyĭ Amerikanets Russian-language newspaper begins publication.
  - Population: 223,532.
- 1986 - Manila Times East newspaper begins publication.
- 1988 - Sister city relationship established with Cusco, Peru.
- 1990 - Population: 228,537.
- 1991 - Govinda Sanskar Kendra Center active (approximate date).
- 1993 - Liberty Science Center opens.
- 1994 - Sister city relationships established with Ahmedabad, India and Nantong, China.
- 1995 - Sister city relationship established with Ozamiz, Philippines.
- 1997
  - Shiva Mandir shrine opens.
  - Bret Schundler becomes mayor.
  - October: E-ZPass activated for the Holland Tunnel Boyle Plaza.
  - Sister city relationships established with Jerusalem, Israel and Vitória, Brazil.
- 1998
  - Parts of Ellis Island deemed part of Jersey City per New Jersey v. New York 532 U.S. 767 (1998).
  - City website online.
  - Sister city relationship established with Oviedo, Spain.
- 1999
  - Jersey City Landmarks Conservancy established.
  - Sister city relationship established with Sant'Arsenio, Italy.
- 2000 - Population: 240,055.

== 21st century ==
- 2001
  - Jersey City Museum opens.
  - Sister city relationship established with Kolkata, India.
- 2002 - Sister city relationship established with Saint John's, Antigua.
- 2004
  - November: Jerramiah T. Healy elected mayor.
  - Sister city relationship established with San Martín del Rey Aurelio, Spain.
- 2005 - New Jersey Arya Samaj Mandir Humanitarian Mission headquartered in city.
- 2008 - Sister city relationship established with Rosario, Argentina.
- 2010 - Population: 247,597.
- 2011 - Golden Door Film Festival begins.
- 2013 - Steven Fulop becomes mayor.
- 2020 - Population: 292,449.
- 2023 - The Museum of Jersey City History opens at The Apple Tree House - 298 Academy Street, Jersey City

== See also ==
- Jersey City history
- Bergen Township, New Jersey (1661–1862)
- Timeline of Jersey City, New Jersey-area railroads
- National Register of Historic Places listings in Hudson County, New Jersey
- List of mayors of Jersey City

== Bibliography ==
Published in the 19th century

- Thomas Francis Gordon (1834), "Jersey City", Gazetteer of the State of New Jersey, Trenton: Daniel Fenton, OCLC 4366560
- Isaac Costa, ed. (1866). Gopsill's Jersey City and Hoboken Directory. James Gopsill.
- "Jersey City", Goulding's Business Directory of New York, Brooklyn, Newark, Paterson, Jersey City, and Hoboken, Lawrence G. Gulding, 1875
- George H. Farrier, ed. (1879), Memorial of the centennial celebration of the Battle of Paulus Hook, August 19, 1879; with a history of the early settlement and present condition of Jersey City, N.J., Jersey City, OCLC 1742471, OL 24332553M
- "Jersey City" . Encyclopædia Britannica. Vol. 9 (9th ed.). 1879.
- George Ripley; Charles A. Dana, eds. (1879). "Jersey City". The American Cyclopaedia (2nd ed.). New York: D. Appleton and Company.
- Richard Edwards (1882), "Jersey City", Industries of New Jersey, vol. 6: Hudson, Passaic and Bergen Counties, New York: Historical Publishing Company, OCLC 21190682
- William H. Shaw (1884), "Jersey City (etc.)", History of Essex and Hudson Counties, New Jersey, Philadelphia: Everts & Peck
- F. Killenberger (1887), "Jersey City", F. Killenberger's Pocket Gazetteer of the State of New Jersey, New Brunswick: New Jersey Pub. Co.
- "Jersey City". Quarter-Century's Progress of New Jersey's Leading Manufacturing Centres. NY: International Publishing Company. 1887.
- Jersey City Street Railway Guide, Jersey City: Stephen & Hansen, printers, 1890, OL 17940894M
- Charles Winfield (1891). Monograph on the Founding of Jersey City. New York: Caxton Press.
- Herbert Foster Gunnison (1896), "Jersey City", Visitor's Guide to the Greater New York, Jersey City and Suburbs, Brooklyn, N.Y.: Eagle Press
- Harriet Phillips Eaton (1899), Jersey City and its Historic Sites, Jersey City: The Woman's Club, OL 17939320M

Published in the 20th century

- "Jersey City" . Encyclopædia Britannica. Vol. 15 (11th ed.). 1910. p. 331.
- Walter Gregory Muirheid (1910), Jersey City of To-Day: its history, people, trades, commerce, institutions & industries, OL 17940833M
- Arthur Fremont Rider (1916), "Jersey City", Rider's New York City and Vicinity, including Newark, Yonkers and Jersey City, New York: H. Holt and Company
- "Jersey City, Hudson County". Industrial Directory of New Jersey. Paterson NJ. 1918.
- Board of City Commissioners of Jersey City (1920). Jersey City Development Plan.
- Federal Writers' Project (1946). "Jersey City". New Jersey: a Guide to its Present and Past. American Guide Series. NY: Hastings House. hdl:2027/mdp.39015010421512.
- Kevin Lynch (1960), "Three Cities: Jersey City", Image of the City, Cambridge, Massachusetts: MIT Press, p. 25+, OL 5795447M
- Ory Mazar Nergal, ed. (1980), "Jersey City", Encyclopedia of American Cities, New York: E.P. Dutton, OL 4120668M

Published in the 21st century

- Patrick Shalhoub; Carmela A. Karnoutsos, eds. (2003). "Jersey City Past and Present". New Jersey City University. + Chronology
