= Bergen Tunnels =

Pair of railroad tunnels in New Jersey, US

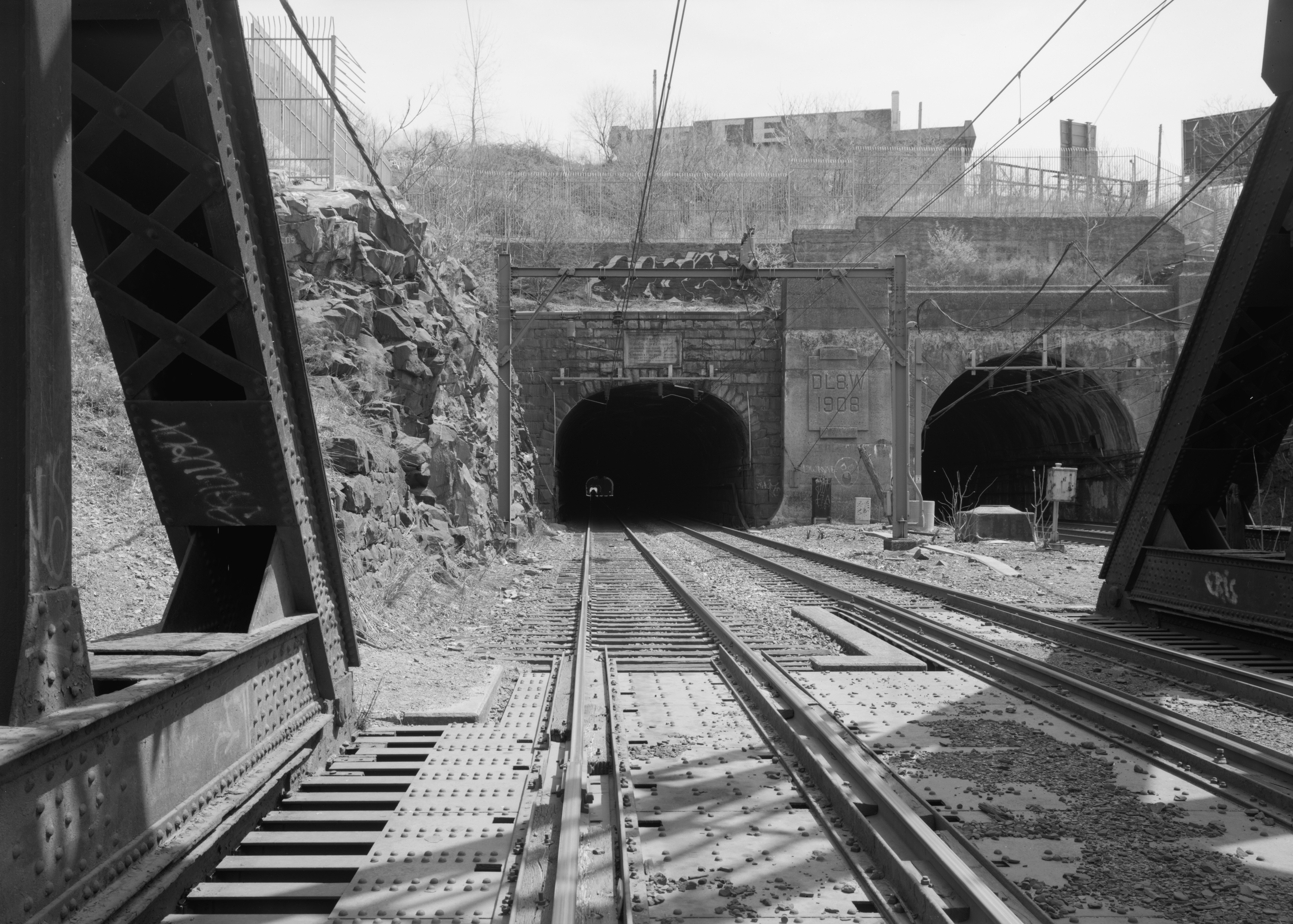
- Western portal (2001)
- Interactive map of Bergen Tunnels

Overview
- Location: Bergen Hill; Hudson Palisades; Jersey City, New Jersey

Further information
Coordinates
System	New Jersey Transit
Operation
Constructed	1877; 1910
Owner	NJ Transit
Traffic	Railroad
Character	Passenger
Technical
Design engineer	James Archbald; Samuel Rockwell
Length	4,200 feet (1,300 m) approx.
No. of tracks	2 per tube
Track gauge	1,435 mm (4 ft 8 1/2 in) standard gauge
Electrified	Overhead line, 25 kV 60 Hz AC

The Bergen Tunnels are a pair of railroad tunnels with open cuts running parallel to each other under Bergen Hill in Jersey City, New Jersey, U.S. Originally built by the Delaware, Lackawanna and Western Railroad (DL&W), they are used by New Jersey Transit Rail Operations (NJT) trains originating or terminating at Hoboken Terminal.

== Construction ==
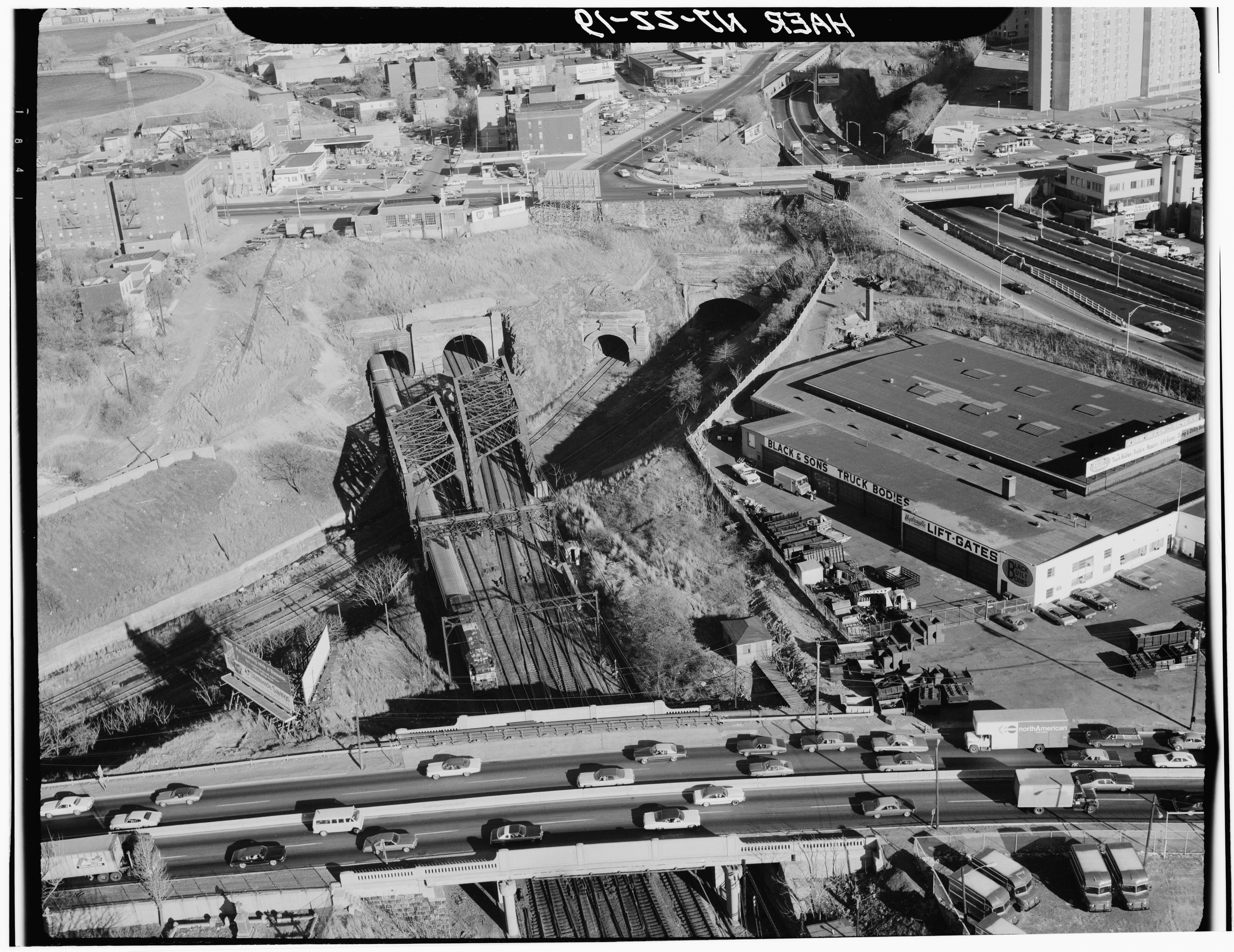
The western portals of four railroad tunnels and cuts through Bergen Hill in Jersey City in 1978. From left: the Bergen Tunnels, the Long Dock Tunnel, and the Bergen Arches.

Prior to construction, the Morris and Essex Railroad, a predecessor of the DL&W, used the Long Dock Tunnel, owned by the Erie Railroad, to pass under the Hudson Palisades. After issues of congestion and competition arose, the DL&W decided to build its own tunnel for what is commonly known as its Morristown Line. Construction of the North Bergen Tunnel began in 1873; it came into service in 1877. The South Bergen Tunnel opened in 1910, soon after a new Hoboken Terminal was inaugurated. Both tunnels are approximately 4,200 ft (1,300 m) long, and have two short segments of open cut as well as ventilation shafts.

== Rehabilitation ==
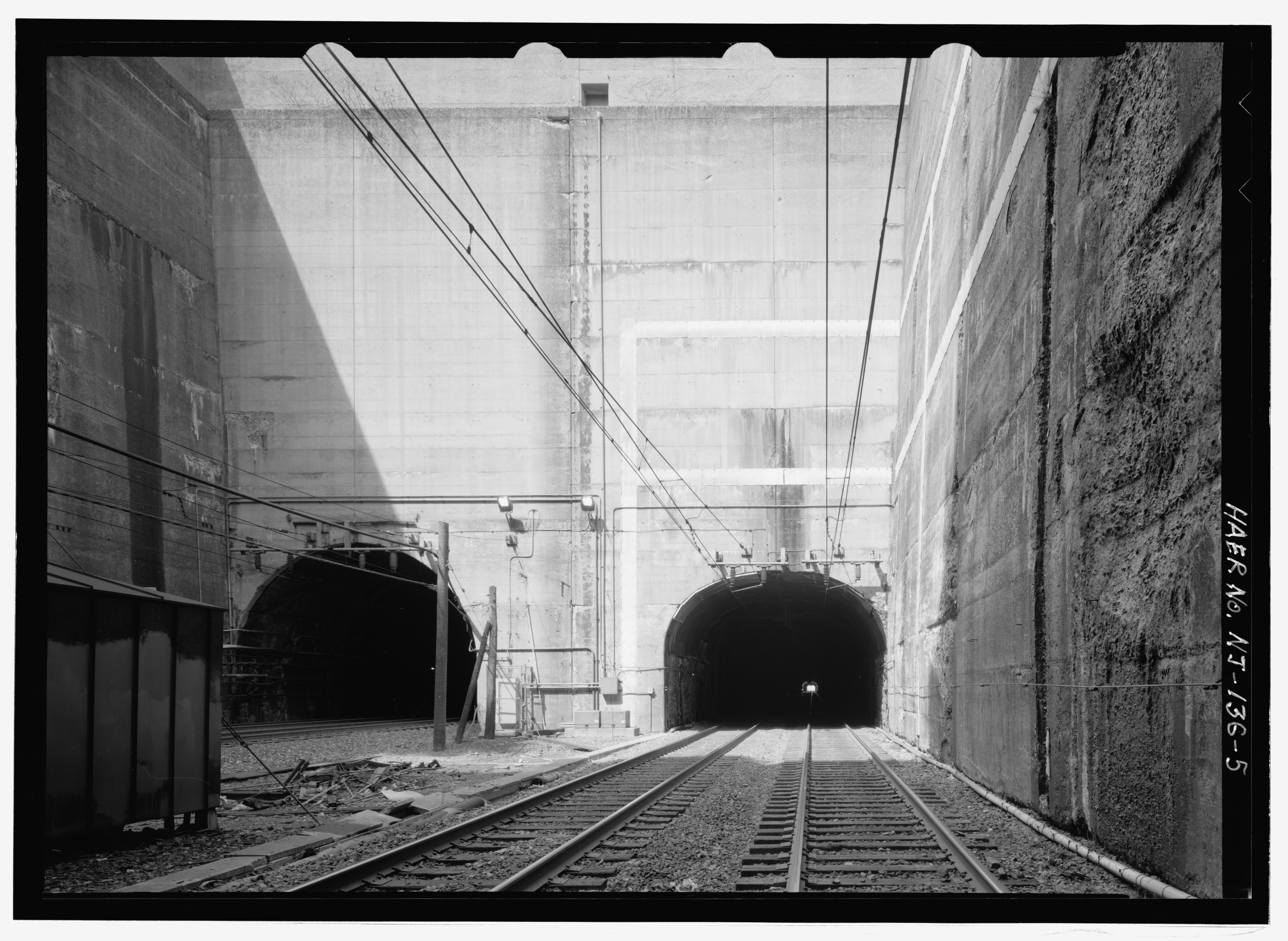
The tunnel portals from within Open Cut No. 1, facing east, before renovation in 2001

In 2001, New Jersey Transit contracted JV Merco-Obayashi for the rehabilitation of the partially brick-lined North Bergen Tunnel. This included the stabilization of the two open cuts. The five ventilation shafts were stabilized and backfilled. Brick was removed so that the tunnel could be enlarged using drill-and-blast methods, following which it was relined with shotcrete. A drained membrane waterproofing system was installed before a final lining of concrete was cast-in-place. In addition to waterproofing ceilings and walls, new electrical, signal and ventilation systems were installed as were new emergency exits. New tracks were affixed directly to a new concrete floor.

There are unfunded plans to rehabilitate the South Bergen Tunnel as it suffers from water leakage and icicle formation during the winter months.

== Historic status ==
The tunnels are part of New Jersey's state historic preservation office historic district, designated the Old Main Delaware, Lackawanna and Western Railroad Historic District. They were documented in 2001 for the Historic American Engineering Record.

Survey No.	Name (as assigned by HAER)	Built	Documented	Carries	Crosses	Location	County	Coordinates
NJ-136	D,L&W, North Bergen Tunnel	1877	2001	NJ Transit Hoboken Division tracks	Bergen Hill	Jersey City	Hudson	40°44′25″N 74°03′45″W
NJ-137	D,L&W, South Bergen Tunnel	1911	2001	NJ Transit Hoboken Division tracks	Bergen Hill	Jersey City	Hudson	40°44′24″N 74°03′45″W

== See also ==
- List of bridges, tunnels, and cuts in Hudson County, New Jersey
- Timeline of Jersey City, New Jersey-area railroads
