= Timeline of Jersey City, New Jersey-area railroads =

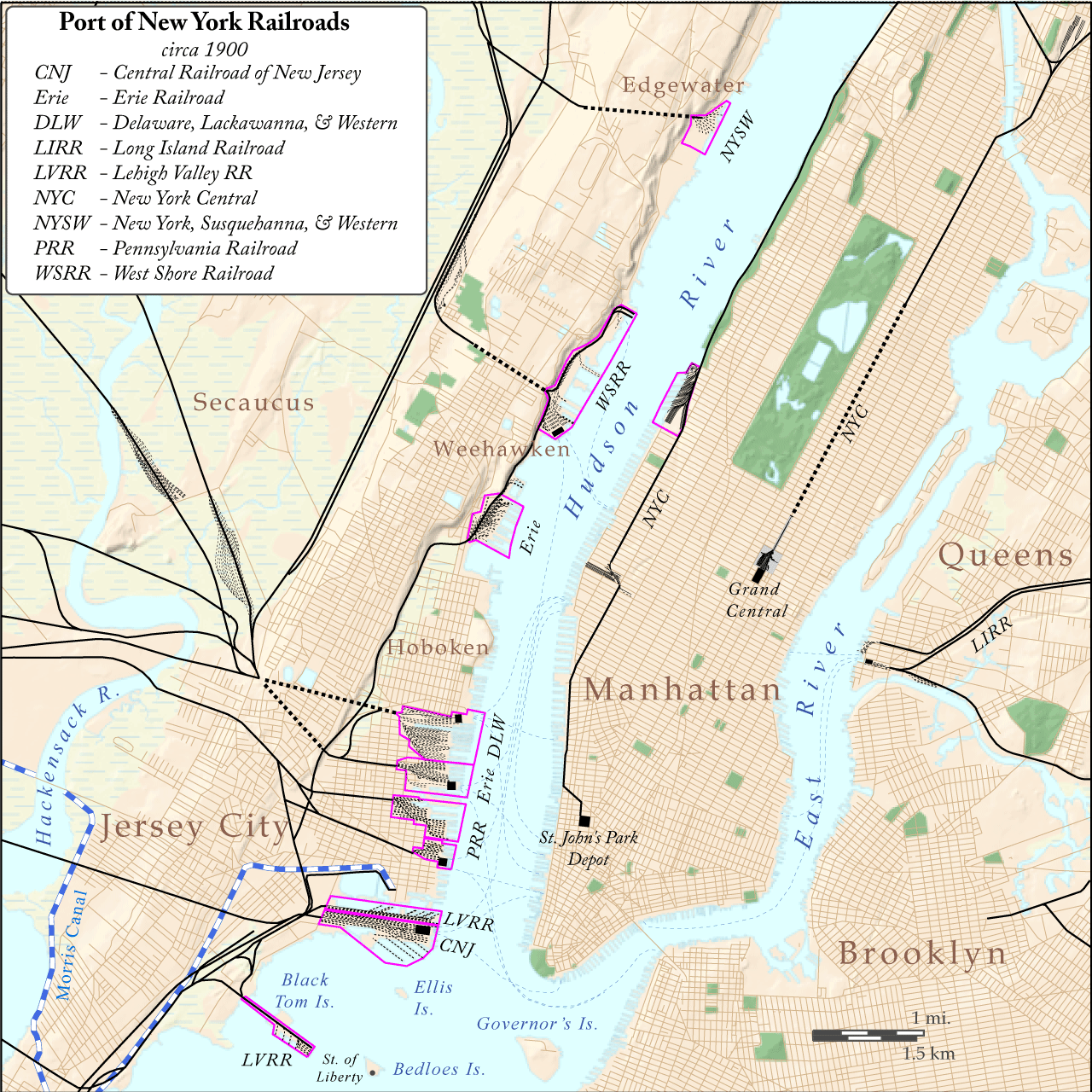
Port of New York Railroads ca. 1900

For the purposes of this article, the Jersey City area extends North to Edgewater (the Northern end of the line along the Hudson River), South to Bayonne and includes Kearny Junction and Harrison but not Newark. Many routes east of Newark are listed here.

== Railroad Name Abbreviations ==
- B&O: Baltimore and Ohio Railroad
- CNJ: Central Railroad of New Jersey
- CRCX: Conrail Shared Assets Operations
- DL&W: Delaware, Lackawanna, and Western Railroad
- Erie: Erie Railroad
- LV: Lehigh Valley Railroad
- NYC: New York Central Railroad
- NYO&W: New York, Ontario and Western Railway
- NYS&W: New York, Susquehanna and Western Railway
- PATH: Port Authority Trans-Hudson
- PRR: Pennsylvania Railroad
- RDG: Reading Railroad

== 1833 ==
- November 28: The Paterson and Hudson River Railroad (Erie) opens at Marion Junction, ending at the New Jersey Railroad (PRR).

== 1834 ==
- September 15: The New Jersey Railroad, which 38 years later would become the Pennsylvania Railroad (PRR), begins regular trips from Newark to Jersey City's first terminal. The route crosses the Passaic River on the Newark, over Centre Street Bridge to the Hackensack River and onto Jersey City, on the West side of the Palisades. It uses temporary tracks and horse-drawn trains around and over the Bergen Hill, to the Terminal on the Hudson at Paulus Hook for transfer to ferries bound for New York City.

== 1836 ==
- The Morris Canal is extended from Newark through Jersey City.

== 1837 ==
- The New Jersey Railroad (PRR) cut through the Palisades opens; the Paterson and Hudson River Railroad (Erie) also uses it.

== 1838 ==
- December 2: The New Jersey Railroad (PRR) switches from horse to steam power.

== 1858 ==
- The Pennsylvania Railroad builds a five-track passenger station and ferry at Hudson Street.

== 1861 ==
- January 28: The Long Dock Company (Erie) finishes its tunnel through the Palisades, bypassing the PRR cut.
- March 14: The New York and Bull's Ferry Railroad (NYC) is chartered and buys the Hoboken and Hudson River Turnpike.

== 1862 ==
- March 8: The New York and Bull's Ferry Railroad (NYC) changes its name to the New York and Fort Lee Railroad.
- May: The Pavonia Ferry (Erie) opens.

== 1864 ==
- July 29: The CNJ's Jersey City extension opens, from about Spring Street in Elizabeth to the Jersey City terminal, including a long bridge across Newark Bay.

== 1868 ==
- The Passaic and Harsimus Line (PRR), opens for a new freight terminal at Harsimus Cove.

== 1869 ==
- July 23: The full length of the Newark and New York Railroad (CNJ) opens, from Broad St terminal in Newark to the CNJ at Communipaw.

== 1870 ==
- February 22: The New Jersey Railroad (PRR) builds a new bridge over the Passaic River, cutting the distance through Newark and Harrison. Some passenger trains continue to use the old alignment, the Centre Street Branch.
- December 2: A frog war begins between the Erie and DL&W at the west end of the Erie's tunnel where the new Boonton Branch would join.
- December 14: The DL&W begins running passenger trains on its Boonton Branch.
- The New York and Fort Lee Railroad (NYC) opens.
- The PRR leases the United New Jersey Railroad and Canal Company.

== 1871 ==
- January 9: The frog war between the Erie and DL&W ends, with the frog being placed to allow DL&W Boonton Branch trains to run through the Erie's tunnel.

== 1872 ==
- August 23: Trains are first to run along the Erie's Newark and Hudson Railroad from Newark through their tunnel to Jersey City.

== 1873 ==
- The Pennsylvania Railroad constructs a new passenger ferry terminal with 12 tracks and six platforms. The wooden terminal is built on piers over the water.
- The Hudson Connecting Railway, part of the New Jersey Midland and later NYS&W, completed to West End Junction with Erie connection to Marion Junction.

== 1877 ==
- May 12: The DL&W opens its new tunnel through the Palisades, ending its trackage rights through the Erie's tunnel. Included with the tunnel are western approaches to the DL&W mainline and Boonton Branch; the former includes a new bridge over the Hackensack River, south of the old one (which is then used only for the Erie's Newark and Greenwood Lake Branches). The new alignment at first crosses the New Jersey Midland Railroad (NYS&W) at grade.

== 1883 ==
- The National Docks Railway is constructed to connect the National Storage Company docks at Black Tom with the Pennsylvania Railroad in Jersey City. The PRR controls and operates the railroad until 1889, when control passes to the New York Central Railroad after completion of the New Jersey Junction Railroad. In 1894, the Lehigh Valley Railroad acquired half interest and obtains full control in 1900.

== 1884 ==
- The West Shore Railroad's (NYC) tunnel through the Palisades to Weehawken Terminal opens.
- August 4: The Pennsylvania Railroad passenger and ferry terminal at Exchange Place burns as a result of an explosion in a gas reservoir underneath the station.

== 1885 ==
- December 5: NYC leases the West Shore Railroad for 475 years from January 1, 1886, with the privilege of an additional 500-year term.

== 1886 ==
- June 30: The New Jersey Junction Railroad (NYC) leases .24 mi (0.39 km) of the New York and Fort Lee Railroad. The rest later disappears in the West Shore Railroad's (NYC) Weehawken yard.
- July 1: NYC leases the New Jersey Junction Railroad for 100 years, with the option of another 100-year term.

== 1887 ==
- May: The New Jersey Junction Railroad (NYC) opens for freight.
- June: The New Jersey Junction Railroad (NYC) opens for passengers.
- October: The Lehigh Valley Railroad settles a long legal battle with the Central Railroad of New Jersey, opening the way to build a Jersey City terminal on land originally purchased in 1872 for the New Jersey West Line Railroad.

== 1889 ==
- The Lehigh Valley Railroad constructs its freight terminal on the south side of the Morris canal basin at South Cove, adjacent to the Central Railroad of New Jersey terminal. The LVRR reaches its new terminal over CNJ tracks on a five-year lease.

== 1890 ==
- The Lehigh Valley Railroad constructs the Edgewater Railway, on the north side of the Morris Canal basin.

== 1891 ==
- The Pennsylvania Railroad (PRR), rebuilds the passenger ferry terminal to replace the old terminal which was partially destroyed by fire. The new terminal is raised 15–20 ft (4.6–6.1 m) above the old level to accommodate new elevated rails that eliminate grade crossings in the city.

== 1892 ==
- The Lehigh Valley Railroad opens its bridge across Newark Bay. The LVRR connects with the National Docks Railway east of the bridge in order to reach the LVRR terminal.

== 1894 ==
- May 15: The New York, Susquehanna and Western Railway Edgewater Tunnel through the Palisades opened to freight traffic. The mile-long tunnel took 18 months to construct and provides the NYS&W access to its own waterside terminal in Edgewater. The NYS&W had previously used the DL&W terminal in Hoboken.

== 1897 ==
- The Hoboken Manufacturers Railroad opens.
- The National Docks and New Jersey Junction Connecting Railway (LV + NYC) is completed. This line was mainly a short tunnel under the Pennsylvania Railroad to connect the New Jersey Junction Railroad (NYC) with the National Docks Railway (LV + NYC). For nine years the PRR fought the construction of the line both in the courts and on the ground, at one point dumping stone into the tunnel and turning fire hoses onto the construction crews.

== 1900 ==
- The Greenville and Hudson Railway (LVRR) completes construction of a line roughly parallel to the National Docks Railway from the Newark Bay bridge to the Jersey City terminal. Upon completion, the Lehigh Valley Railroad has a wholly owned route from the coal fields of Pennsylvania to its terminal in Jersey City.

== 1908 ==
- February 26: The Hudson and Manhattan Railroad (PATH) opens from 19th Street Manhattan to Hoboken Terminal.

== 1909 ==
- July 19: The Hudson and Manhattan Railroad (PATH) opens from Hudson Terminal (World Trade Center) to Exchange Place.
- August 2: The Hudson and Manhattan Railroad (PATH) opens its connection from Exchange Place, north towards Hoboken Terminal.

== 1910 ==
- November 27: The Pennsylvania Tunnel and Terminal Railroad (PRR) opens from Kearny Junction into New York Penn Station. Manhattan Transfer opens.
- The Penhorn Creek Railroad's (Erie) four-track cut through the Palisades (Bergen Arches) opens, just south of the Erie's two-track tunnel, including a western approach through Secaucus.

== 1911 ==
- March 14: The New Jersey Shore Line Railroad (NYC) opens from the West Shore Railroad's (NYC) Weehawken yard to the NYS&W at Shadyside, about .85 mi.
- May 16: Cars first move on the New Jersey Shore Line Railroad (NYC).
- October 1: The Hudson and Manhattan Railroad (PATH) is extended through Jersey City to Manhattan Transfer.
- November 26: The Hudson and Manhattan Railroad (PATH) is extended from Manhattan Transfer to Newark Park Place.

== 1937 ==
- June 20: Manhattan Transfer closes and the Hudson and Manhattan Railroad (PATH) is realigned to Newark Penn Station.

== 1939 ==
- August 1: The NYS&W begins bus service from Susquehanna Transfer to Times Square via the Lincoln Tunnel.

== 1959 ==
Weehawken Terminal closes. The Weehawken is the last ferry to the terminal on March 25, 1959, at 1:10 am, ending 259 years of continuous ferry service.

== 1960 ==
- The Erie Railroad trains shift to Hoboken Terminal, as the company merges with the Lackawanna Railroad.

Erie trains began moving to Hoboken in Oct 1956 for off peak and weekend trains. Peak hour trains began using Hoboken on March 25, 1957, with the exception of Nyack and NYS&W trains which continued to use the few remaining tracks in Jersey City. NYS&W trains were later discontinued and Nyack trains used a backup move to reach Hoboken until they were discontinued in 1966.

== 1967 ==
- With the Aldene Plan, Communipaw Terminal, the last Jersey City terminal closes. Lehigh Valley trains now terminate at Newark Penn Station, as do Reading Railroad trains. CNJ Trains run over LV from Roselle Park, NJ to Newark, NJ then on the PRR and terminate at Newark Penn Station, and use a small yard in Harrison. It was not until the late 1990s, when the midtown direct service was instituted, that NJ TRANSIT ran a service of some Raritan Valley trains to Hoboken (Penn Sta. New York).

== 1983 ==
NY Waterway re-institutes ferry service across the Hudson.

== 1994 ==
A short, partially elevated track, known as the Marion Running Track, is built to connect the ex-PRR Passaic and Harsimus Line from Kearny to the ex-Erie Northern Branch. This reconfiguration provided the ex-NYC West Shore (aka River Line) with a more direct connection to other lines heading west and south at Marion Junction.

== 1999/2000 ==
Conrail Shared Assets Operations created. CSX River line is shifted to the re-newed Northern Running track to North Bergen Yard.

== 2000 ==
The Hudson–Bergen Light Rail opened to the public on April 15, 2000, with an initial operating (MOS) The extension to southern terminal at 8th Street opened January 31, 2011.

== 2001 ==
NJ Transit renovates Bergen Tunnels.

== 2003 ==
Secaucus Junction opened on December 15, 2003.

== 2009 ==
On July 26, 2009, NJ Transit began shuttle service to the Meadowlands station at the Meadowlands Sports Complex.

== 2010 ==
On October 7, 2010, New Jersey governor Chris Christie announced that the Access to the Region's Core, which included a new right-of way from Secaucus Junction under the Hudson Palisades and Hudson River to Midtown Manhattan was officially cancelled.

== 2019 ==
ExpressRail at Port Jersey opened on June 17, 2019.

== See also ==
- List of historical passenger rail services serving New York City
- North River (Hudson River)
- Communipaw Terminal
- Weehawken Terminal
- Pavonia Terminal
- Exchange Place (Jersey City)
- Hoboken Terminal
- Bergen Hill
- List of crossings of the Hackensack River
- List of bridges, tunnels, and cuts in Hudson County, New Jersey
- List of crossings of the Lower Passaic River
- Rail freight transportation in New York City and Long Island
- Timeline of Jersey City, New Jersey history

== Sources ==
- Poor's and Moody's railroad manuals
- New-Jersey Railroad Improvements, The New York Times February 23, 1870, page 5
- Local News in Brief, The New York Times November 28, 1870, page 8
- Almost a Riot, The New York Times December 3, 1870, page 1
- Local News in Brief, The New York Times December 15, 1870, page 8
- Local News in Brief, The New York Times January 10, 1871, page 8
- New-Jersey, The New York Times August 24, 1872, page 8
- The New Bergen Tunnel, The New York Times May 12, 1877, page 10
