= New Jersey Shore Line Railroad =

Overview
- Headquarters: Weehawken, New Jersey
- Locale: Hudson River shore in New Jersey
- Dates of operation: 1886–1914
- Successor: New Jersey Junction Railroad

Technical
- Track gauge: 4 ft 8 1/2 in (1,435 mm) standard gauge

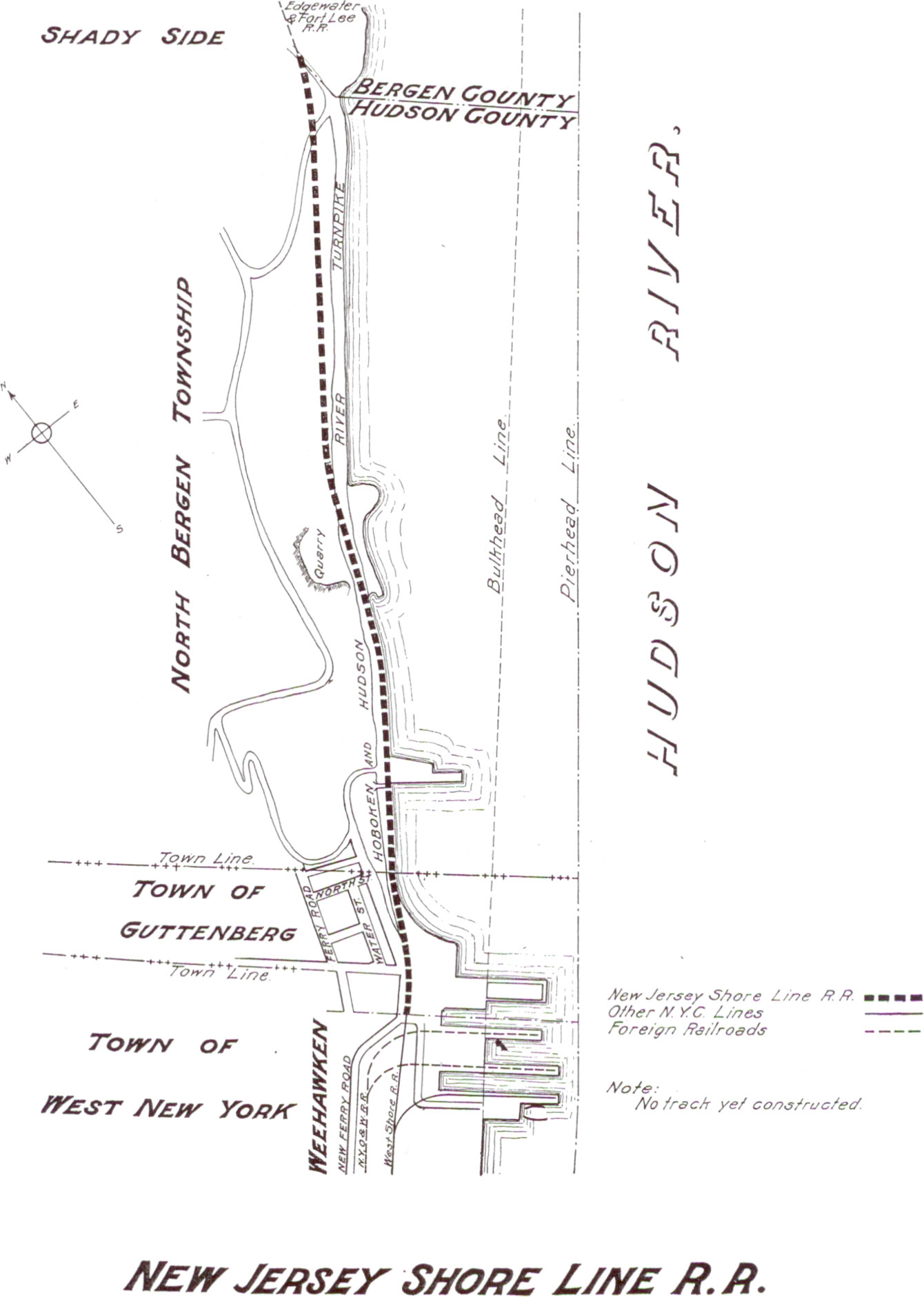
A 1909 map of the New Jersey Shore Line Railroad, when it was still proposed. See New Jersey Junction Railroad for a 1921 map showing it completed.

The New Jersey Shore Line Railroad was part of the New York Central Railroad and ran along the Hudson River in New Jersey, from the West Shore Railroad (NYCRR) yards at Guttenberg north to the Erie Terminals Railroad at the Hudson/Bergen County line.

The company was organized on February 25, 1886, and chartered March 2, 1886 to build a railroad from a point in Union Township to a point in Harrington, about 15.5 miles (24.9 km) away. The entire capital stock was owned by the New Jersey Junction Railroad Company, which was under lease by the New York Central and Hudson River Railroad. In 1910, .84 miles (1.35 km) of track were built from the West Shore Railroad Weehawken yards midway through Guttenberg north to the line with Bergen County. It opened for traffic on March 14, 1911, with the first cars passing over it on May 16, 1911. The rest of the route was never built.

The company was absorbed into the New Jersey Junction Railroad, which had owned its stock, on October 24, 1914. Eventually the line passed under control of CSX and Norfolk Southern; it was part of their River Line before it was abandoned.

== See also ==
- Timeline of Jersey City area railroads
