= Bergen Arches =

Abandoned railroad right-of-way in Jersey City, New Jersey, United States

Coordinates: 40.7369°N 74.0594°W

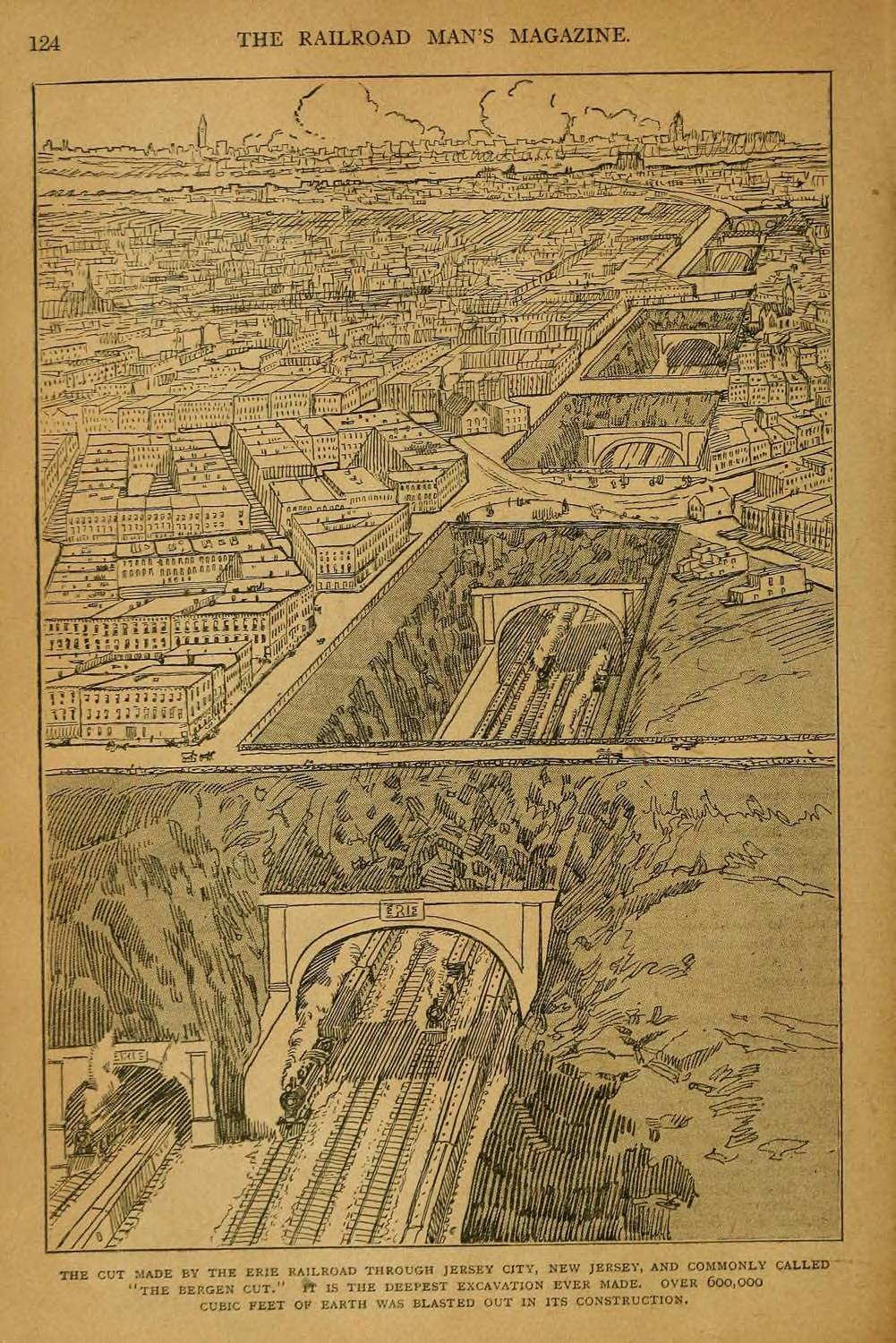
"The Greatest Railroad Cut" 1910

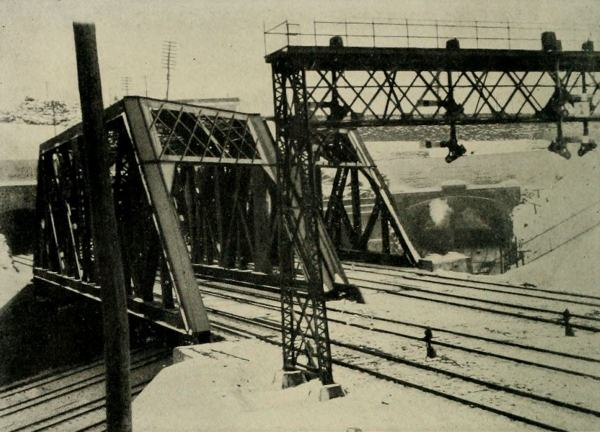
The busiest tunnel point in the world in 1911, the six Erie Railroad tracks exiting the Bergen Arches below and four Lackawanna tracks all emerging from tunnels under Bergen Hill

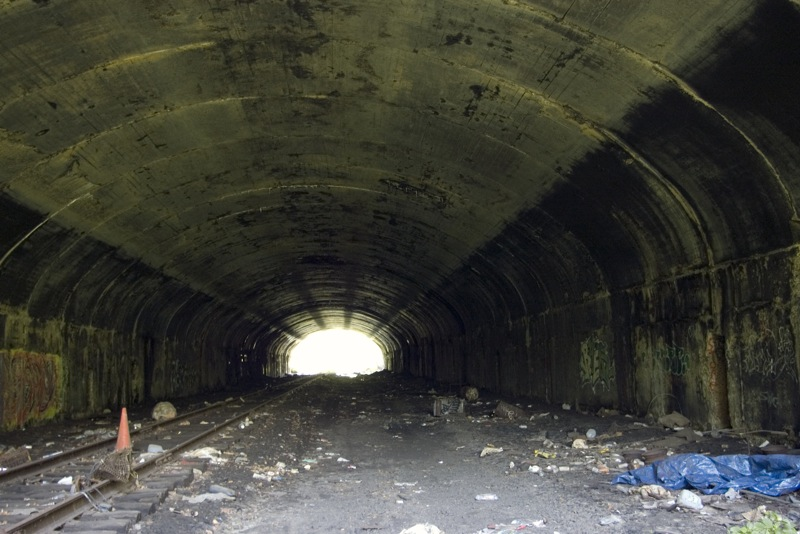
The unused tunnel cut

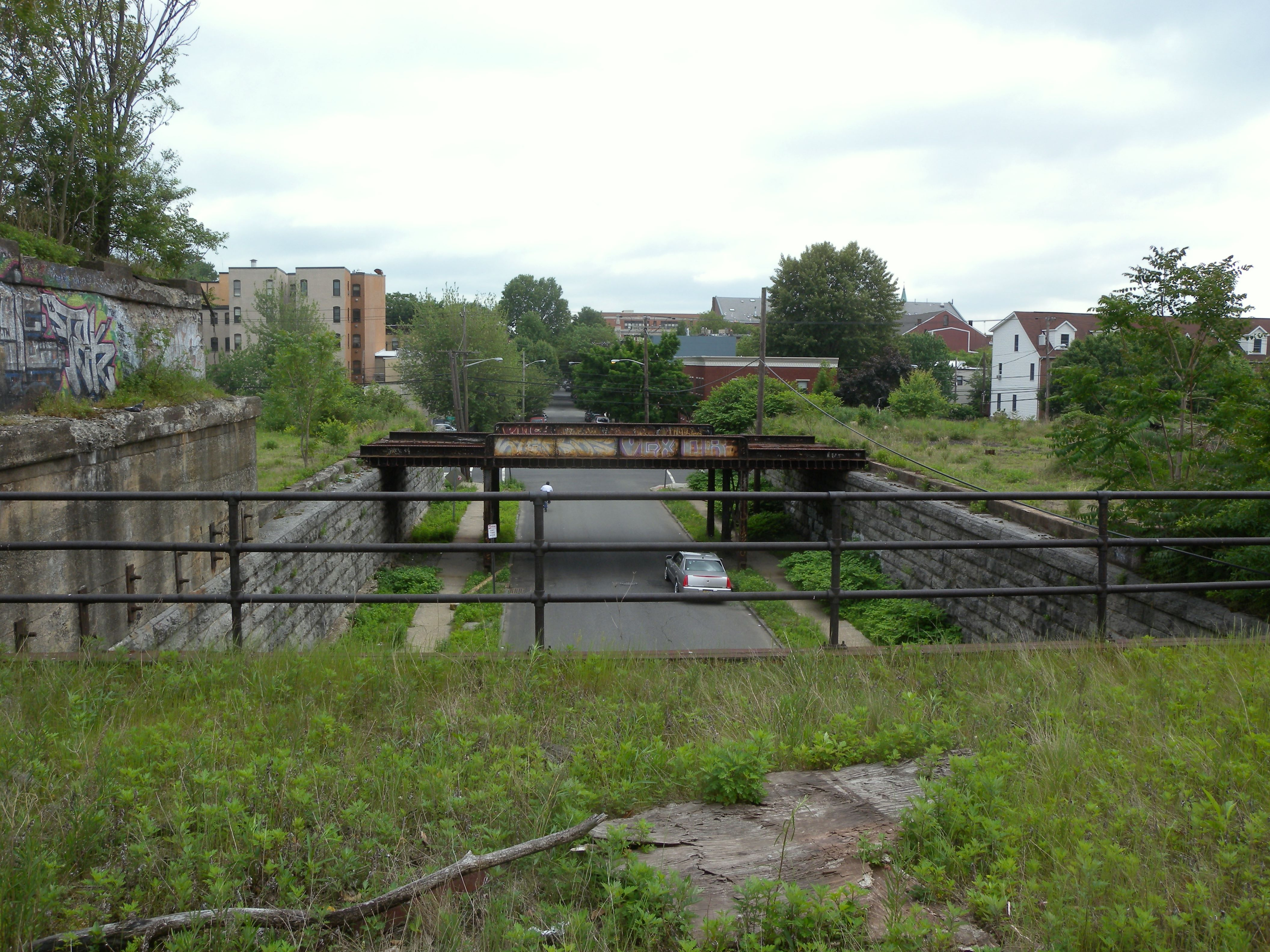
After leaving the Erie Cut, trains traveled over city streets to reach the depot.

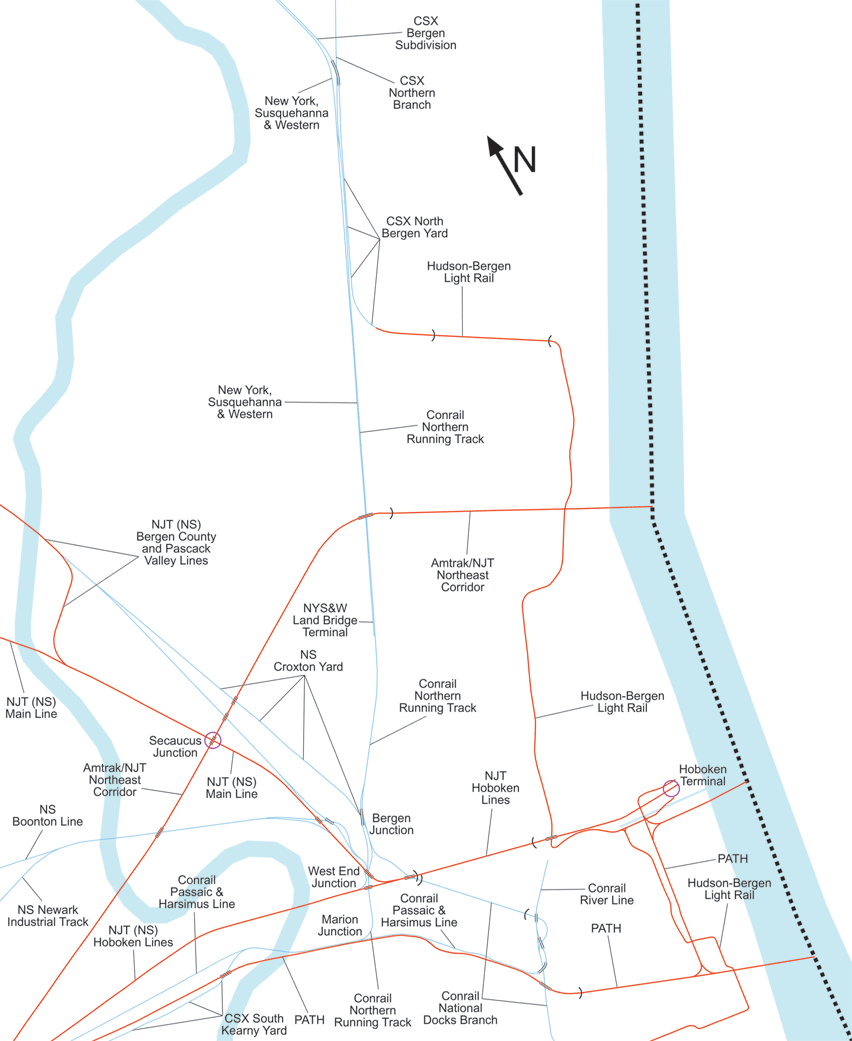
A map of the current active railroads of northern Hudson County. The Bergen Arches are not shown, but they are immediately adjacent to the Bergen Tunnel which is the part blue line marked "Conrail National Docks Branch" which runs between the tunnel portal just east of the West End Junction (bottom center) and the tunnel portal just west of the connection with the Conrail River Line stub.

Bergen Arches is an abandoned railroad right of way through Bergen Hill (the lower New Jersey Palisades) in Jersey City, New Jersey.

== History ==
Bergen Arches is the common name for the Erie Cut, the Erie Railroad's mile-long, four-track cut which linked the railroad's main line to its Hudson River waterfront Pavonia Terminal, where travelers to Manhattan could transfer to the Pavonia Ferry or the Hudson and Manhattan Railroad. From 1906 to 1910, using 250,000 pounds of dynamite, workers blasted through 800,000 cubic yards (610,000 m^{3}) of blue trap rock; 160,000 cubic yards (120,000 m^{3}) of earth were excavated. There were construction cost overruns (and settlements paid to local homeowners for damage and injuries from flying rock), with a total cost around $5 million, that led to financial trouble for the Erie and the cancellation of plans to build a new terminal along the Jersey City waterfront. The term "Bergen Arches" originally referred to the massive bridges over the cut, but the two terms have become synonymous.

The last trains to the terminal ran in 1957. The line was abandoned that year. The adjacent tunnel (the Long Dock Tunnel) from the mid-19th century that the Erie Cut replaced is used for freight, and is being restored as part of Liberty Corridor Project as an extension of National Docks Secondary line.

== Future ==
Various projects have been proposed for the abandoned track bed: for a four-lane or six-lane highway that would connect the New Jersey Turnpike and U.S. Route 1/9 bypassing traffic headed along New Jersey Route 139 for the Holland Tunnel, extension of the Hudson Bergen Light Rail, or in conjunction with the Harsimus Stem Embankment, a recreational greenway.

A freeway proposed in 1989 by Governor Thomas Kean was strongly supported by then-Mayor Bret Schundler. In 1998, this project was allocated $26 million in the federal Transportation Equity Act for the 21st Century. During the 2001 mayoral race, candidates instead lobbied for a mass transit line, and in 2002 the plans were dropped during Mayor Cunningham's administration. In that year, Parsons Brinckerhoff, a consulting firm, released another report commissioned by New Jersey Department of Transportation (NJDOT) and describing the conditions and analyzing of various options. NJDOT has continued to fund studies for the project. In March 2011, an additional $13.4 million was allocated to advance the project.

A Bergen Arches Preservation Coalition has proposed to run the East Coast Greenway through the Arches.

In 2025, NJ Transit announced that as part of the planned BRT Transitway from Secaucus Junction to the Meadowlands Sports Complex, they allocated $22 million to complete design and engineering work for Phase 2 from Secaucus to Jersey City via the Bergen Arches.

== See also ==
- List of bridges, tunnels, and cuts in Hudson County, New Jersey
- List of Erie Railroad structures documented by the Historic American Engineering Record
- Timeline of Jersey City area railroads
