= List of historical passenger rail services serving New York City =

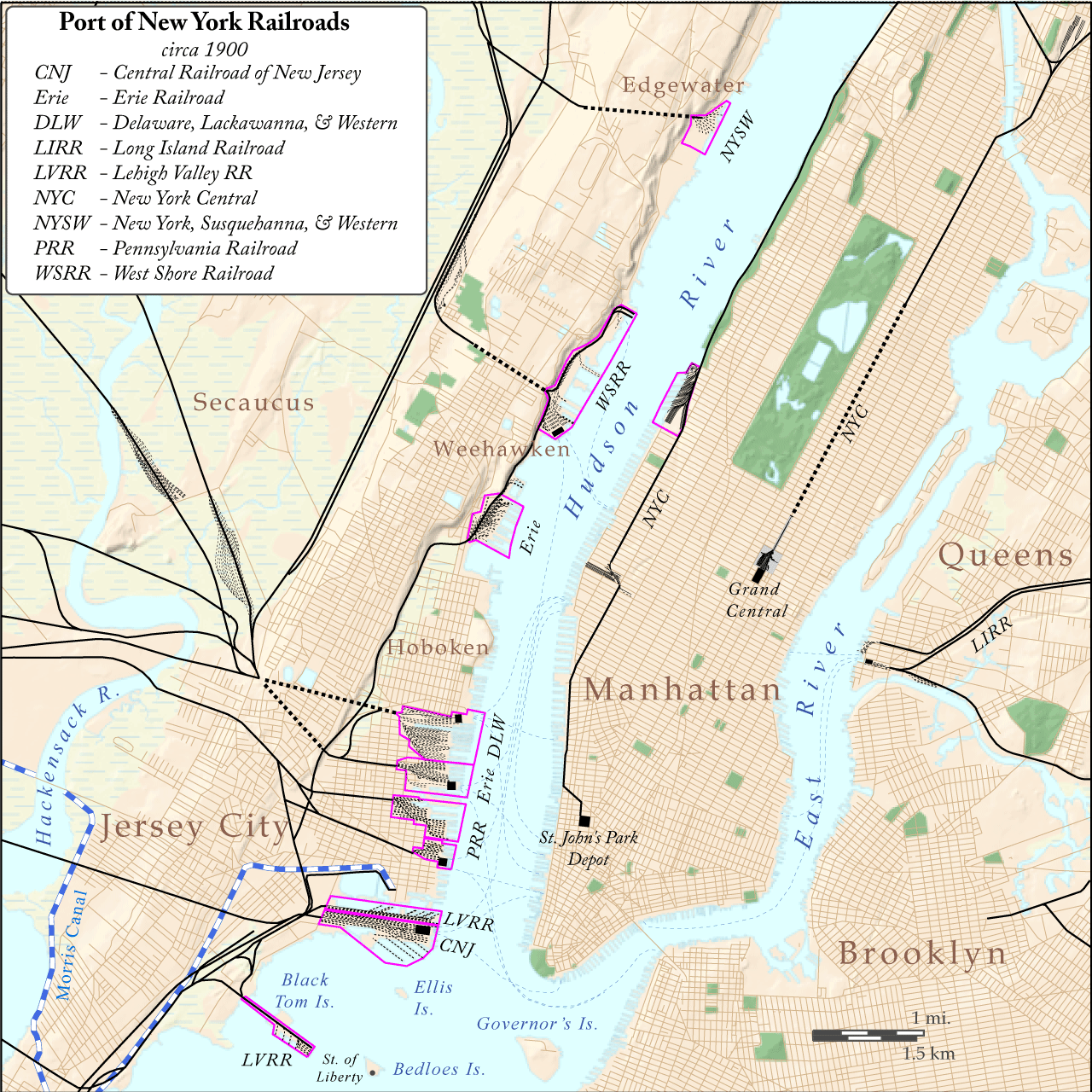
New York City Railroads ca. 1900

The table below shows all railroad lines that have served New York City and what terminal they used. A red background indicates that the railroad owned a part or full share of the terminal.

Railroads	Successor railroad	Penn Station (PRR)	Grand Central (NYCRR)	Hoboken (DL&W)	Communipaw (CNJ)	Exchange Place (PRR)	Weehawken (NYCRR)	Pavonia (Erie)	Other stations
Metro-North	–		1983–present	1983–present					
NJ Transit	–	1983–present							
Amtrak	–	1971–present	1971–1991						
Long Island	–	1910–present	2023–present						Long Island City (1854–present); Atlantic (1877–present)
Conrail	MNRR, NJT	1976–1983	1976–1983	1976–1983					
Penn Central	Amtrak, Conrail	1968–1976	1968–1976						
Erie Lackawanna	Conrail			1960–1976					
Pennsylvania	PC	1910–1968				–1961			
New York Central	PC		1913–1968				–1959		
New York, New Haven and Hartford	PC	?	–1968						
Jersey Central	–				–1967				
New York, Susquehanna and Western	–							–1961	Susquehanna Transfer (1939–1966)
Lehigh Valley	–	1918–1961			1913–1918	–1913			
Delaware, Lackawanna and Western	EL			–1960					
Erie	EL			1956–1960				–1958	
Baltimore and Ohio	–	1919–1926			–1958				
New York, Ontario and Western	–						–1953		

== See also ==
- North River (Hudson River)
- Bergen Hill
- Timeline of Jersey City area railroads
- List of ferries across the Hudson River in New York City
