= Paterson and Hudson River Railroad =

Overview
- Headquarters: Jersey City, New Jersey
- Locale: Jersey City to Paterson
- Dates of operation: 1833–1852
- Successor: New York and Erie Railroad

Technical
- Track gauge: 4 ft 8 1/2 in (1,435 mm) standard gauge

The Paterson and Hudson River Railroad was a railroad that operated in New Jersey and connected the cities of Jersey City and southeast Paterson. The railroad was started in 1833.

The company was the first in the United States to build moveable bridges for rail, crossing the Passaic River and Hackensack River.

Originally the Paterson and Hudson River Railroad used a troop of horses to pull the cars along the rails. The first steam locomotive to operate on the line was called the McNeil and manufactured by Robert Stephenson and Company then assembled by Rogers Locomotive and Machine Works.

A decade after opening, the railroad's importance increased when the Paterson and Ramapo Railroad was built connecting north Paterson to Suffern, New York just over the state line. Travelers could use a combination of the two lines (and another transportation method for the 3/4-mile (1.2 km) between the two Paterson terminals) to travel between Suffern and New York City faster than the New York and Erie Railroad. The lines were eventually connected. In 1852, the New York and Erie Railroad leased the track rights of the P&HR and P&R and combined their lines into the "Union Railroad", which soon became the new New York and Erie Railroad mainline. Erie took ownership in 1953.

The first stations west of Bergen Junction along the line included "Germantown", "Hackensack" along the Hackensack River (close to the present-day Secaucus Junction and the former Harmon Cove station) and "Boiling Spring" (at the site of the present-day Rutherford station).

== See also ==
- Timeline of Jersey City area railroads
