= Bergen Hill =

Lower part of the Hudson Palisades, New Jersey, United States

Coordinates: 40.717363°N 74.070515°W

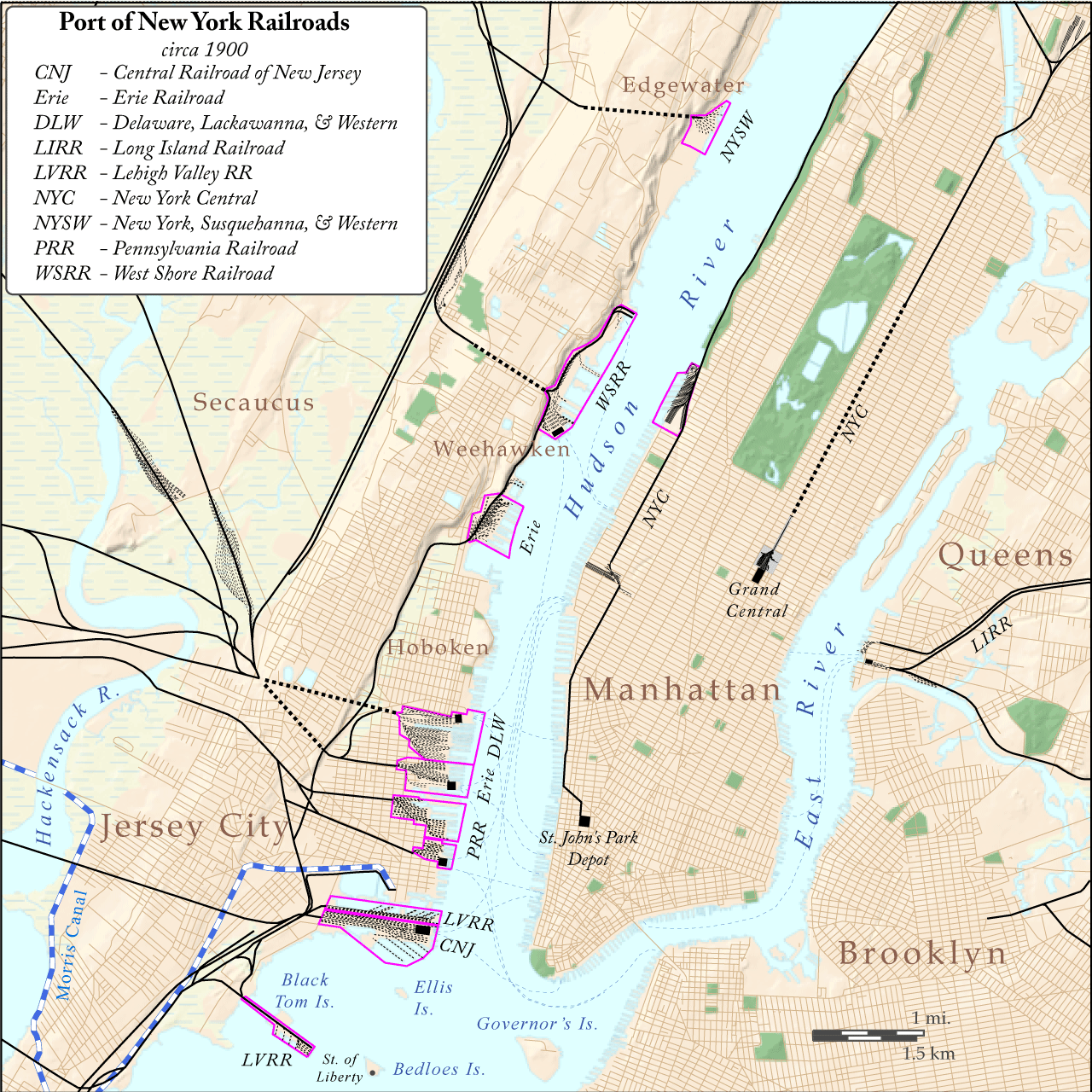
Rail routes across Bergen Hill and their terminals ca. 1900

Bergen Hill refers to the lower Hudson Palisades in New Jersey, where they emerge on Bergen Neck, which in turn is the peninsula between the Hackensack and Hudson Rivers, and their bays. In Hudson County, it reaches a height of 260 feet.

== Rail ==
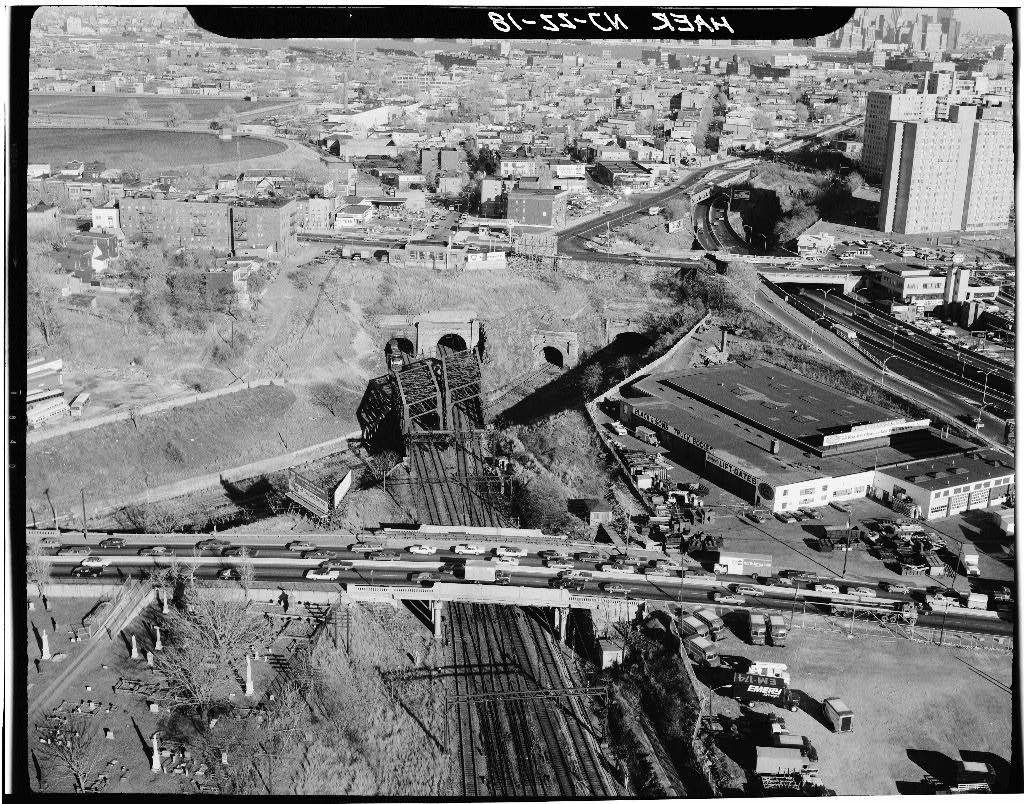
Western portals of Bergen Hill Tunnels, Long Dock Tunnel, Bergen Arches, and Route 1 Extension

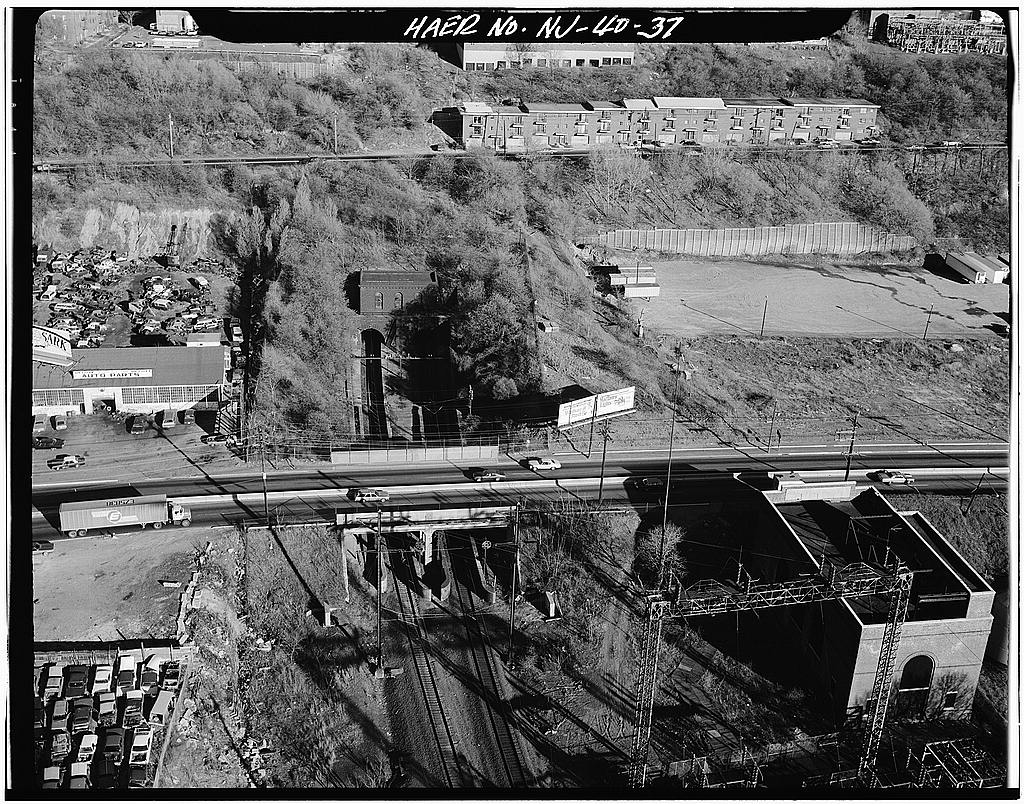
Western portal of North River Tunnels

Artificial features of Bergen Hill include the 19th century and early 20th century railroad rights-of-way. Cuts and tunnels created to provide access to the terminals and ferries on the North River (Hudson River) and Upper New York Bay, and eventually under the river. From south to north they are:

- The Central Railroad of New Jersey lines traveled on the CRRNJ Newark Bay Bridge across Newark Bay and through Bayonne and Greenville to its Communipaw Terminal. Portions are used by the Hudson Bergen Light Rail.
- The Jersey City, Newark and Western Railway (later the Lehigh Valley Terminal Railway) freight line on the bridge over Newark Bay and across Pamrapo is now used by CSX Transportation as the National Docks Secondary to Port Jersey and other points.
- Newark and New York Railroad Branch of the Central Railroad of New Jersey (1869), now the Hudson-Bergen Light Rail West Side Branch, ran from Downtown Newark to Communipaw Terminal.

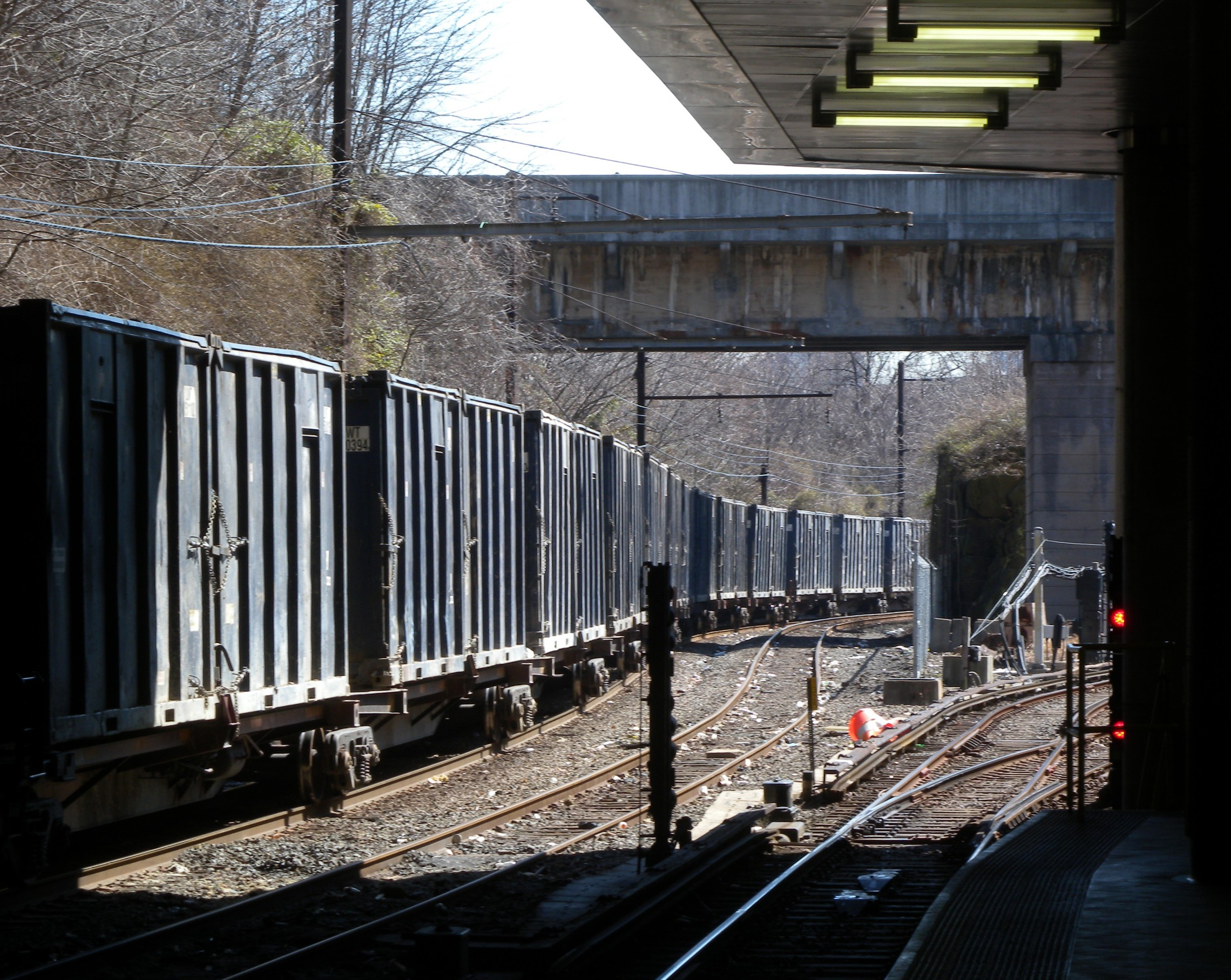
Freight in Bergen Hill Cut

- The Bergen Hill Cut (1838)- opened by New Jersey Rail Road and Transportation Company, eventually to Pennsylvania Railroad to PRR Station at Exchange Place or Harsimus Branch along the Harsimus Stem Embankment to Harsimus Cove. Now used by PATH Journal Square and Newark lines.
- The Erie Cut (1910), whose portals are known as the Bergen Arches-Erie Railroad to Pavonia Terminal, now unused.
- The Long Dock Tunnel (1860)- the first Erie Cut, now Conrail Shared Assets (CRCX) freight line
- The Bergen Tunnels (1876) & (1908) under Jersey City Heights, built by Morris and Essex Railroad and the Delaware, Lackawanna, and Western Railroad, Later, the Erie Lackawanna, and now, New Jersey Transit rail lines to Hoboken Terminal.
- 9th Street-Congress Street (HBLR station) provides elevator service between the platform in Hoboken and Paterson Plank Road in Jersey City Heights.
- The never-built Access to the Region's Core project included a tunnel that would have connected Secaucus Junction with an expanded Pennsylvania Station.
- The Gateway Program, a Northeast Corridor infrastructure expansion project includes a tunnel from its portal in North Bergen to Weehawken Cove, under the Hudson River to New York Penn.
- The North River Tunnels (1910), part of the Northeast Corridor their western entrance called the Bergen Portal
- Liberty Place in Weehawken, was a cut and tunnel for the rail line connecting the waterfront elevator to the entrance of 19th century Eldorado Park, later used by the North Hudson Railway streetcar lines.
- Weehawken Tunnel, (1861) West Shore Railroad, now part of the Hudson Bergen Light Rail
- Edgewater Tunnel (1894) New York, Susquehanna and Western Railway cut and tunnel; the western portal Is in Fairview and the east end in Edgewater

== Streetcars ==
The North Hudson County Railway or its predecessor was responsible for many of the innovative engineering works which made streetcar travel on the east face of Bergen Hill possible, including funicular wagon lifts, an inclined elevated, a luxurious elevator, horseshoe curves, and viaducts.

== Vehicular cuts ==
Other major excavations and structures for vehicular traffic have significantly altered Bergen Hill. Kennedy Boulevard at Journal Square and Journal Square Transportation Center both span the large ravine created there. The divided highway connecting the Pulaski Skyway to the Holland Tunnel runs parallel to the Long Dock Tunnel. The Lincoln Tunnel Approach and Helix connects the Lincoln Tunnel, which itself enters the Palisades before submerging under the Hudson River. Paterson Plank Road, the Wing Viaduct, Hackensack Plank Road, Pershing Road, Gorge Road are located on the face of the cliffs. Shippen Street in Weehawken is small street that makes a double hairpin turn.

== Jersey City section ==
Bergen Hill, Jersey City has sometimes been called colloquially "The Hill", and gives name to The Bergen Hill Historic District Other prominent landmarks on the east side of the hill are the former Jersey City Medical Center (which since 2005 is being renovated and restored as an emerging neighborhood known as Beacon) and the Jersey City High School. Summit Avenue, which starts at The Junction in the Bergen-Lafayette Section follows the route of a path used by Native Americans from their settlement at Communipaw, and was used by New Netherlanders from that village on the bay to the one on the ridge at Bergen. It intersected Newark Plank Road, an early colonial "turnpike" which ran from Paulus Hook over the hill, at Five Corners, and continued north through Bergen Woods, where it connected with Paterson Plank Road and Hackensack Plank Road.

== See also ==
- Newark Plank Road
- Timeline of Jersey City area railroads
- List of stations on the Central Railroad of New Jersey
- List of crossings of the Hackensack River
- List of bridges, tunnels, and cuts in Hudson County, New Jersey
