= Long Dock Tunnel =

Coordinates: 40.7355°N 74.0574°W

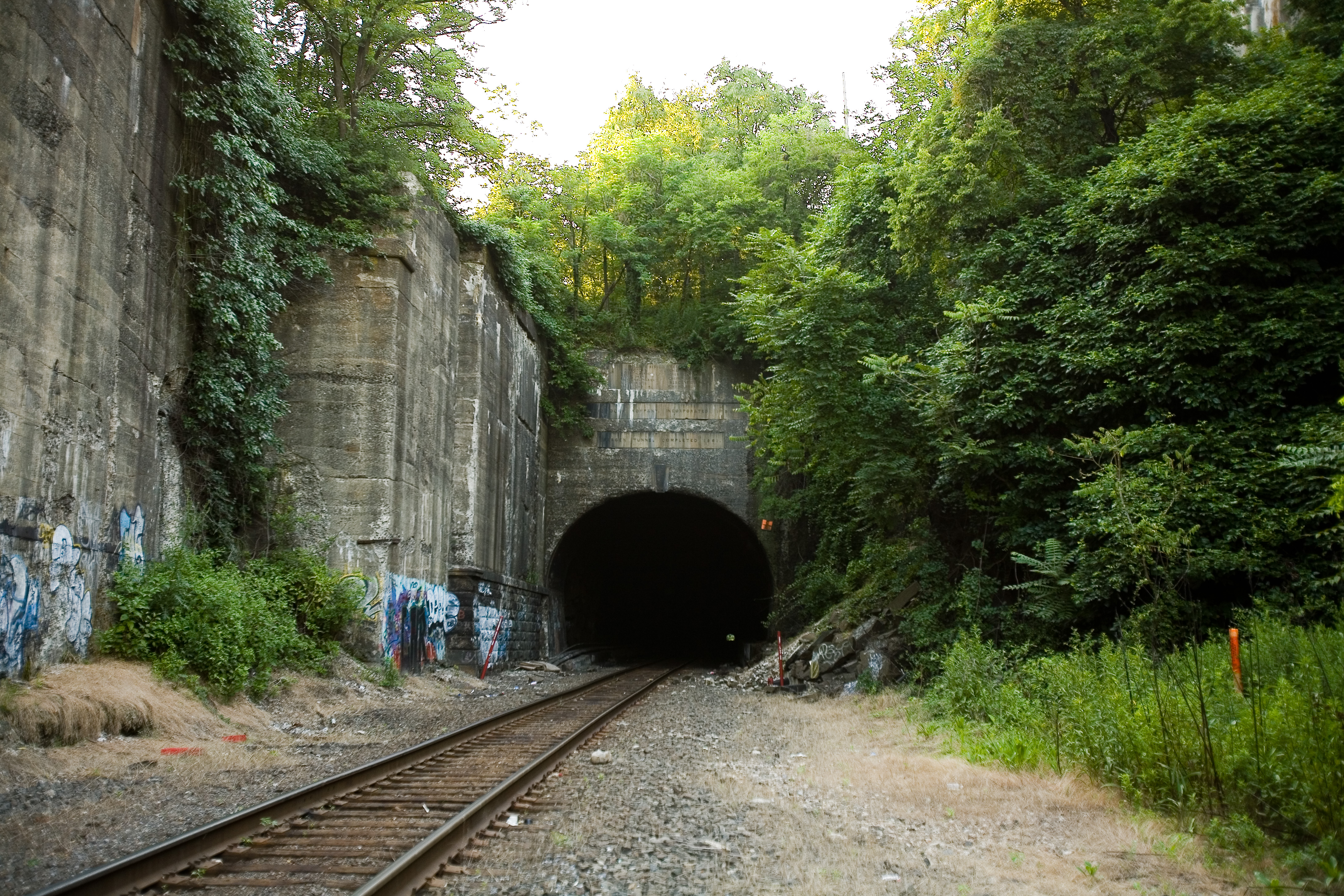
Eastern portal above which are three engraved stones. The first lists the officers and engineers of the company. The seconds reads "Long Dock Company founded 1856". The third reads "Bergen Tunnel completed 1861".

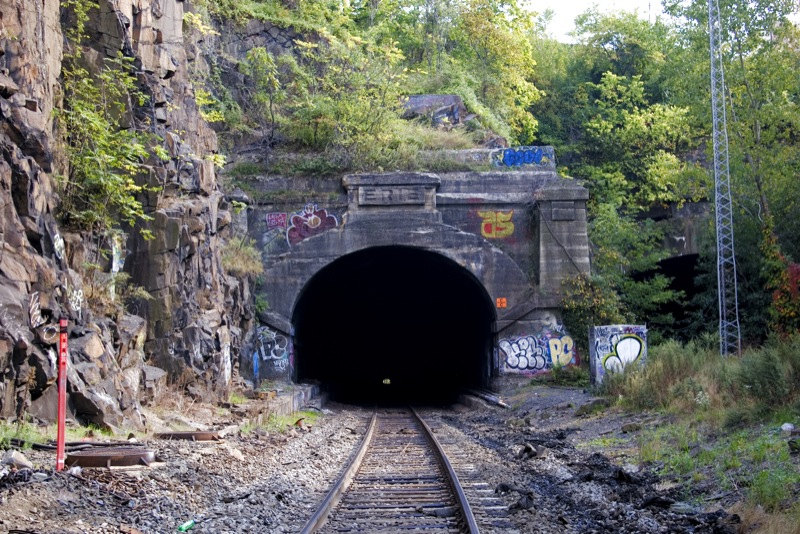
Western portal above which is "Erie", the name of the railroad that owned the tunnel. To the south was the 1910 Erie Cut which traveled under the Bergen Arches.

The Long Dock Tunnel is a freight rail tunnel in Jersey City, New Jersey that is part of the North Jersey Shared Assets Area and used by CSX Transportation on the National Docks Secondary. The single track (formerly dual track) tunnel runs through Bergen Hill, a section of the lower New Jersey Palisades in Hudson County.

== History ==
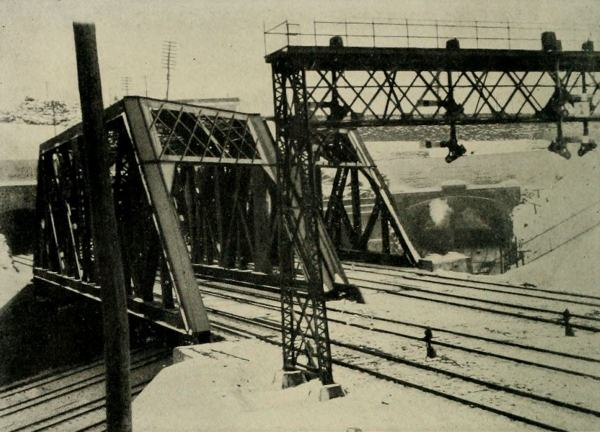
The busiest tunnel point in the world in 1911, six Erie Railroad tracks below four Lackawanna tracks all emerging from tunnels under Bergen Hill

The tunnel was built under the oversight of engineer James P. Kirkwood and was started in 1856 and opened in 1861, costing 57 lives to build. The new tunnel formed became route for both the Erie and Delaware-Lackawanna railroads to reach their respective stations, the Pavonia Terminal and Hoboken Terminal, located on the North River (Hudson River).

The tunnel runs 4,311 feet (1,314 m) long, 23 feet (7.0 m) high, and 30 feet (9.1 m) wide. Eight shafts, 70–90 feet (21–27 m) in depth were sunk down from atop the Palisades to reach the tunnel.

In 1910 the Erie Railroad replaced the Long Dock Tunnel with the Erie Cut, though primarily for use by passenger trains. Erie freight trains continued to use the tunnel as do freight railroads to this day.

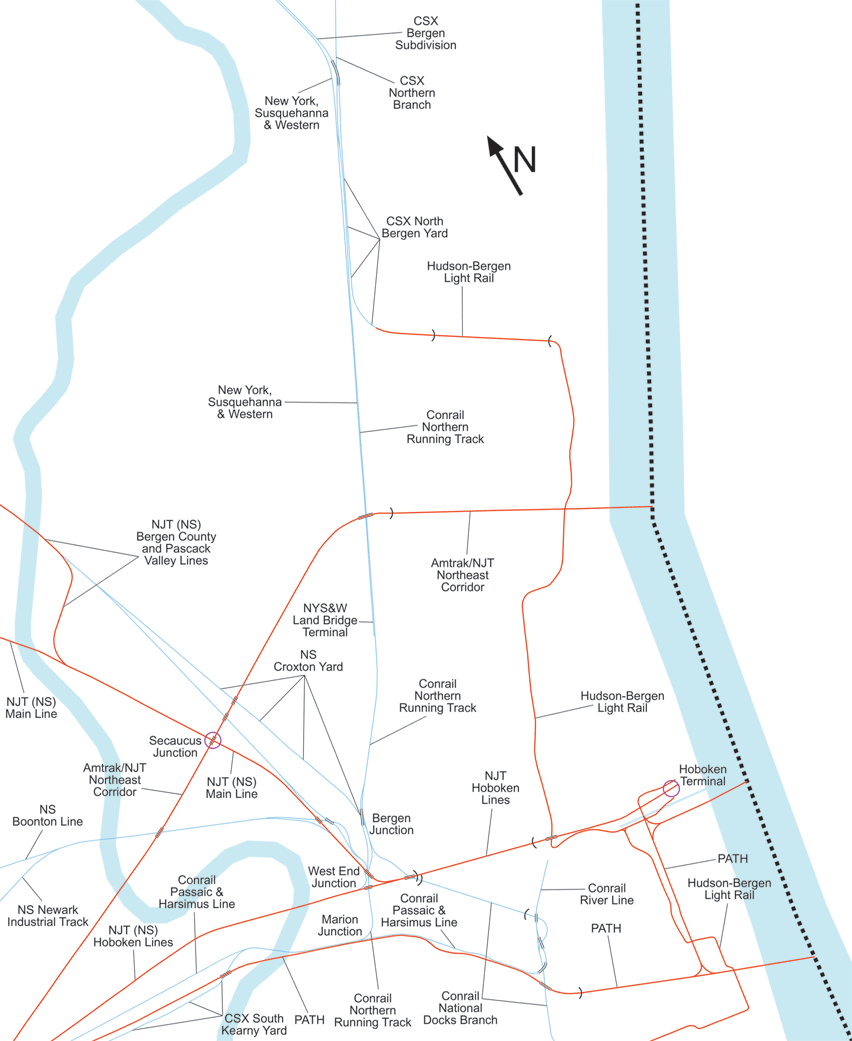
A 2005 map of the active railroads of northern Hudson County. The Long Dock Tunnel is the part of the blue line marked Conrail National Docks Branch which runs between the tunnel portal just east of the West End Junction (bottom center) and the tunnel portal just west of the connection with the Conrail River Line stub.

The northwestern portal is just northwest of where Kennedy Boulevard passes over New Jersey State Route 139. The southeastern portal is near State Route 139 between where it intersects Palisade Avenue and passes over Interstate 78. Part of the viaduct which carried trains to the yards and the terminals is parallel to Boyle Plaza (the entrance and exit roads for the Holland Tunnel) and now serves as an access road to Newport as the current 11th Street.

== See also ==
- List of bridges, tunnels, and cuts in Hudson County, New Jersey
- List of historical passenger rail services serving New York City
- Timeline of Jersey City area railroads
- List of ferries across the Hudson River to New York City
