= North Bergen station =

Railroad station in New Jersey, United States

North Bergen
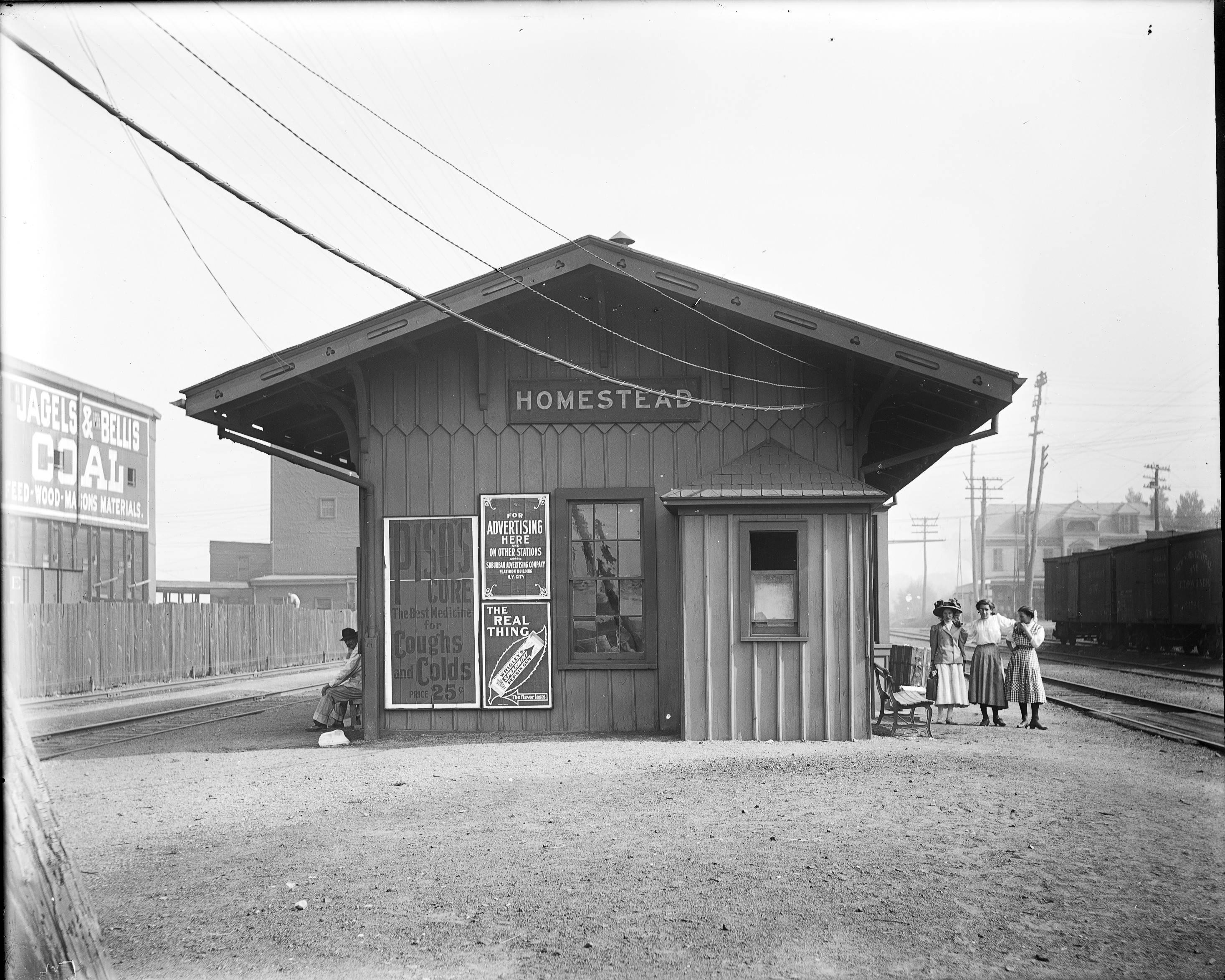
- Homestead c. 1907–1912

General information
- Location: North Bergen, Hudson County, New Jersey 07047
- Coordinates: 40.779422°N 74.039879°W
- Owner: New York, Susquehanna and Western Railroad
- Lines: New York, Susquehanna and Western Railroad; Northern Branch (Erie Railroad)
- Platforms: 1 island platform
- Tracks: 2 NYS&W, 1 Northern Branch

Other information
- Station code: KA

History
- Opened: c.1853
- Electrified: Not electrified
- Former names: Schuetzen Park, Homestead

Services
Preceding station	Erie Railroad	Following station
New Durham toward Nyack	Northern Branch	Susquehanna Transfer toward Jersey City
Preceding station	New York, Susquehanna and Western Railroad	Following station
New Durham toward Stroudsburg	Main Line	Susquehanna Transfer toward Jersey City
Location

North Bergen was a railroad station in North Bergen, New Jersey, United States known as Homestead for most of its existence. It as built in the mid 19th century and served by the New York, Susquehanna and Western Railway (#1059) and the Erie Railroad's Northern Branch (#1903).

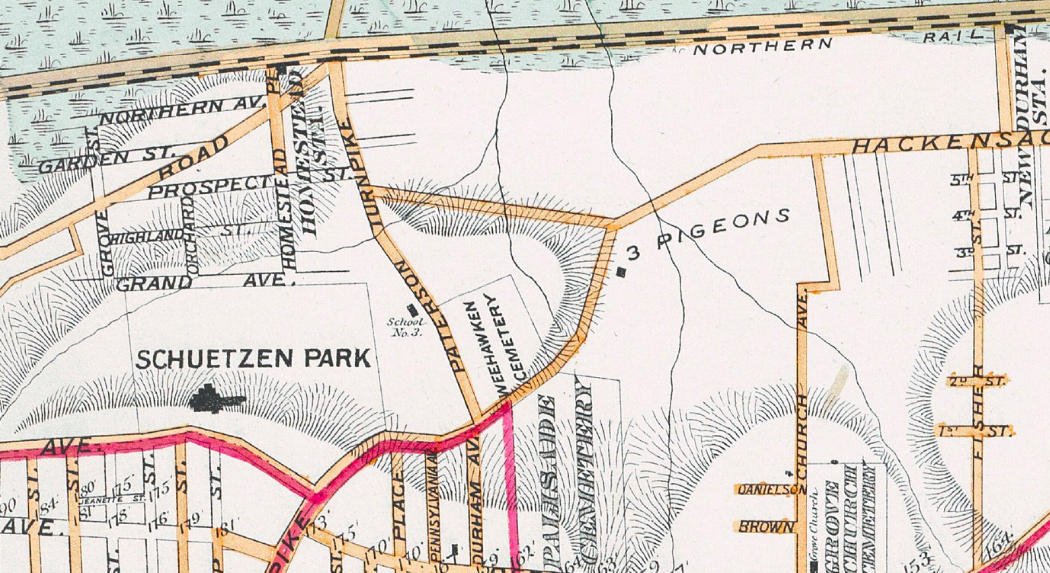
The line and station at the foot of Bergen Hill at the edge of the Meadowlands, 1880

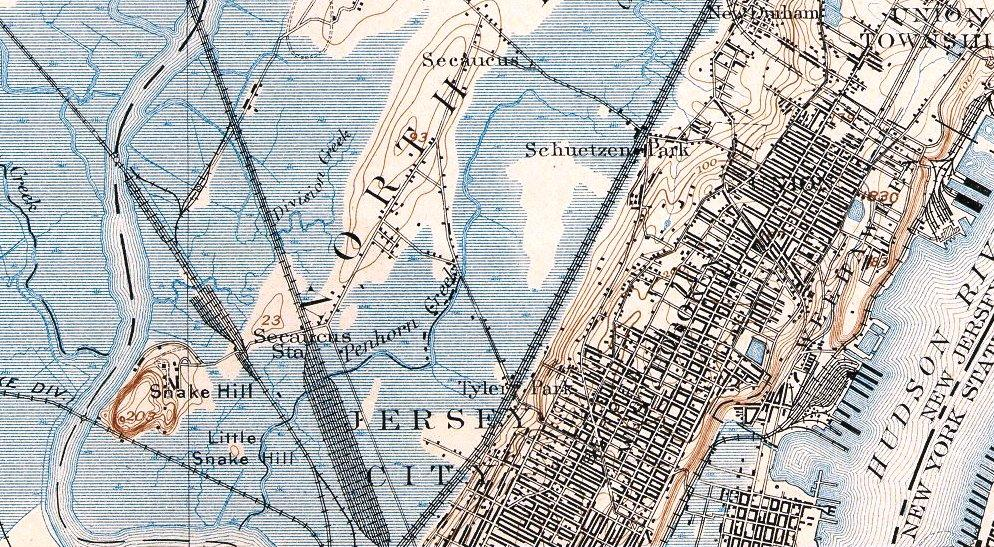
USGS Map from 1900 shows station called Schuetzen Park

The station was located at the foot of the Bergen Hill at Paterson Plank Road west what is now Tonnele Avenue. The village then known as Homestead lay on western slope of lower Hudson Palisades below Schuetzen Park. The abutting village of New Durham was to the north; an eponymous station was located at what is now 50th Street adjacent to North Bergen Yard and the present day terminus of the Hudson–Bergen Light Rail at Tonnelle Avenue. Babbitt, the northernmost station in the township, was at 83rd Street.

The right of way was originally developed by the Paterson and Hudson River Railroad (Erie) in the 1850s. The New Jersey Midland, a predecessor of the New York, Susquehanna and Western Railway (NYSW), built its line to its terminus a West End Junction circa 1873 and had trackage rights south of that point. Homestead was 6 miles (9.7 km) from the Erie's Pavonia Terminal on the Hudson River waterfront in Jersey City, which was originally reached by the Long Dock Tunnel, and later by Bergen Arches. Passenger service on the line was discontinued in 1966.

The station house was demolished, as were most others along Northern Branch, though former station buildings along the line at Englewood, Tenafly, Demarest, Closter, and Piermont still stand. Extant station buildings from the New Jersey Midland/NYSW can be found at Wortendyke, Butler, and Newfoundland, among other places.

The rail line is still used for freight transport by CSX as part of the Conrail Shared Assets Area and the NYSW mainline.

== Bibliography ==
- Carlough, Curtis V.; Fredericks, Harold; Stuy, Timothy; Van Dyk, Fred (1999). The Next Station Will Be... Volume 1 (Revised). New Jersey Midland Railroad Historical Society, Inc. ISBN 9780941652155.

== See also ==
- Timeline of Jersey City, New Jersey-area railroads
- NYSW (passenger 1939–1966) map
- Northern Branch map
- Operating Passenger Railroad Stations Thematic Resource
