= St. Paul's Episcopal Church (Englewood, New Jersey) =

- U.S. National Register of Historic Places
- New Jersey Register of Historic Places
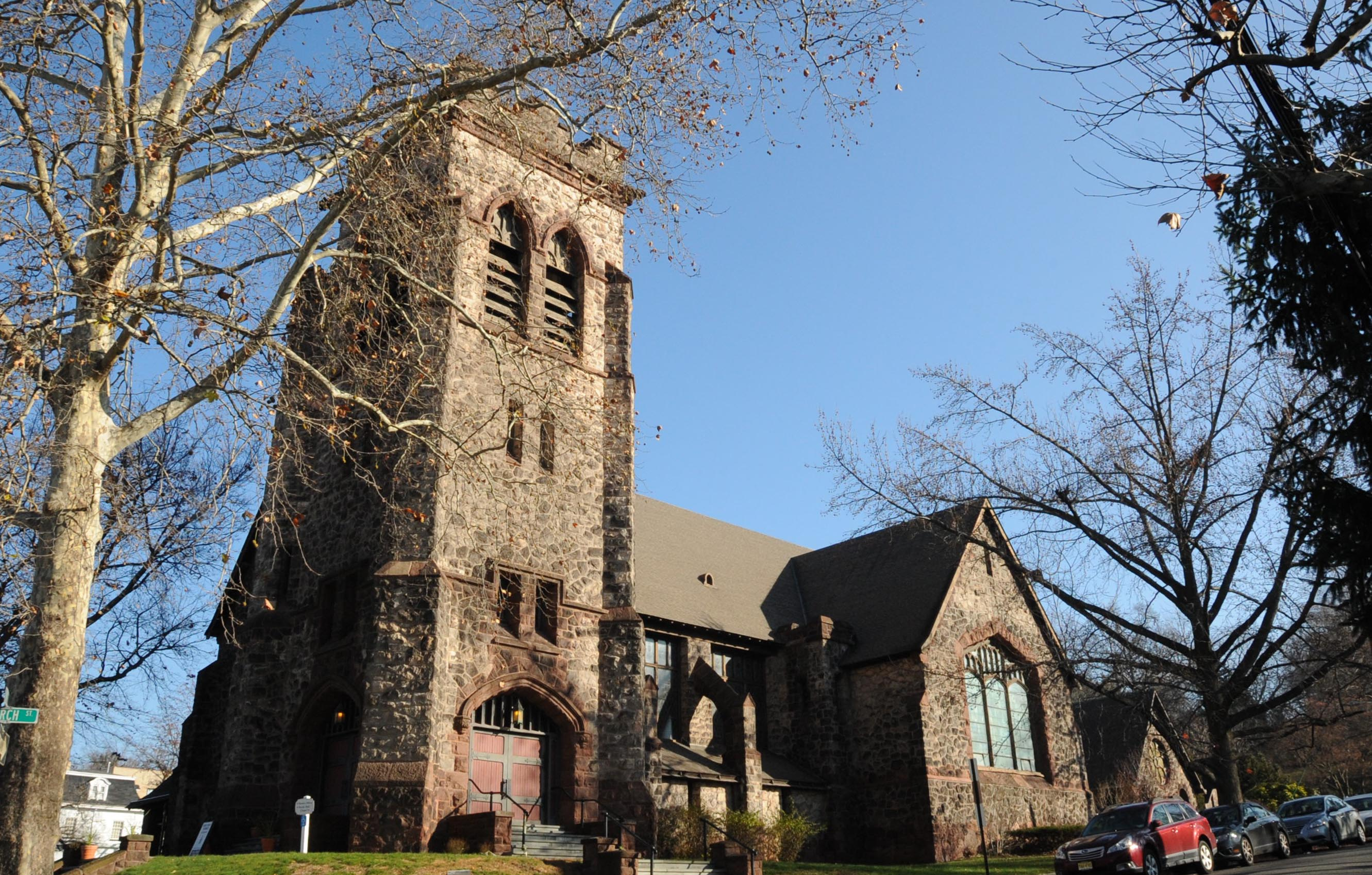
- (2015)

- Location within Bergen County, New Jersey Location within New Jersey Location within the United States
- Location: 113 Engle Street; Englewood, New Jersey
- Coordinates: 40°53′47″N 73°58′13″W
- Built: church: 1899–1900 chapel: 1895 parish house: 1916 eastern addition: 1922
- Architects: church & chapel: Thornton Floyd Turner parish house: Aymar Embury II eastern addition: Charles Wesson Hoadley of Hays & Hoadley
- Architectural style: church: Late English Gothic chapel: Late Victorian parish house: Tudor Revival eastern addition: not listed
- NRHP reference No.: 14000189
- NJRHP No.: 5195

Significant dates
- Added to NRHP: May 5, 2014
- Designated NJRHP: February 20, 2014

St. Paul's Episcopal Church is located at 113 Engle Street at the corner of Church Street in the city of Englewood in Bergen County, New Jersey, United States. The congregation was organized in 1865, and their first church was erected in 1866. It is a parish of the Episcopal Diocese of Newark and the worldwide Anglican Communion. It was listed on the National Register of Historic Places on May 5, 2014, for its significance in art and architecture.

== Building and architecture ==
The current structure, which began construction in 1899 and opened to the congregation on Whitsunday in June 1900, was designed in the late English Gothic style by Thornton Floyd Turner, who also designed the Sunday School building in 1895 which is now a chapel, in the late Victorian revival style. The church has stained glass windows by Louis Comfort Tiffany, John La Farge, Margaret Redmond and the J&R Lamb Studios, and the rose limestone of the original church is in its foundation. The church also has a painting of the Last Supper by Clara Miller Burd, an artist associated with the Tiffany Studios. The church's parish house was designed by Aymar Embury II in the Tudor Revival style and was completed in 1916. An addition to the east side of the church was built in 1922 and was designed by Charles Wesson Hoadley of Hays & Hoadley.

== Clergy ==
Many distinguished clergy have served St. Paul's, including one of the Episcopal Church's most distinguished hymn writers, Howard Chandler Robbins who served as Rector from 1904–1911. The first priest to serve the parish later Bishop of Pennsylvania Ozi William Whitaker. Other distinguished clergy include the Old Testament Scholar Fleming James (1912–1921), Joseph R. Lynes (1922–1932), James A. Mitchell (1932–1962), David M. Gillespie (1962–1978), Jack Marston McKelvey (1978–1991), Kenneth Near (1991–2008), Robert L. Shearer (2009–2014).

== Music ==
Choral music has played an important role at St. Paul's throughout its history. Professional musicians (organists and singers) have been employed since the late 19th century, More recently John Harms, founder of what is now the Bergen Performing Arts Center, served as Organist and Choirmaster from 1947–1957. Other notable musicians include Herbert Henderson, who is buried beneath the main church's chancel and was a successor to Welsh-British composer Edward German. The historic nave houses a three manual and pedal Austin Organ opus 2626 from 1967. The organ includes pipe work from the original 1899 Hutchings-Votey organ as well as a tuba built in 1906 by Robert Hope-Jones, and installed by Hope-Jones and Ernest M. Skinner. A large men and boys choir was formed in 1930 and gave way to a mixed, graded choir program in the mid-1950s. The music program also includes an award-winning after school chorister program, the St Paul's Choir School, founded by Mark A. Trautman, Director of Music (2010–2021). The St. Paul's Choristers have sung at bergenPAC in Englewood, New Jersey Performing Arts Center in Newark, and recorded for HBO films. African American composer Ulysses Kay (1917–1995) and his wife Barbara Kay are interred in the church's memorial garden. Other significant musicians have included James Corneille (1930–1942), Gerald Weale (1966–1973) who was awarded the Presiding Bishop's Certificate in Church Music by the Episcopal Church in 1964, the only such certificate ever granted, and Professor John F. Bullough (1973–1995).

== Outreach ==
Under the direction of Kaileen Alston, Director of Christian Formation, the early twenty-first century St. Paul's expanded its outreach by sponsoring regular in-gatherings for the Center for Food Action; providing dinner for the Hoboken Clergy Coalition Soup Kitchen; hosting at-risk and transitioning families with Family Promise of Bergen County; serving an annual Thanksgiving Community Supper; and helping young men of color/colour (young black and brown men) through the establishment of the Timothy Project Mentoring Ministry.

== See also ==
- National Register of Historic Places listings in Bergen County, New Jersey
