= Bergen Performing Arts Center =

Nonprofit theater in New Jersey, U.S.

- BergenPAC
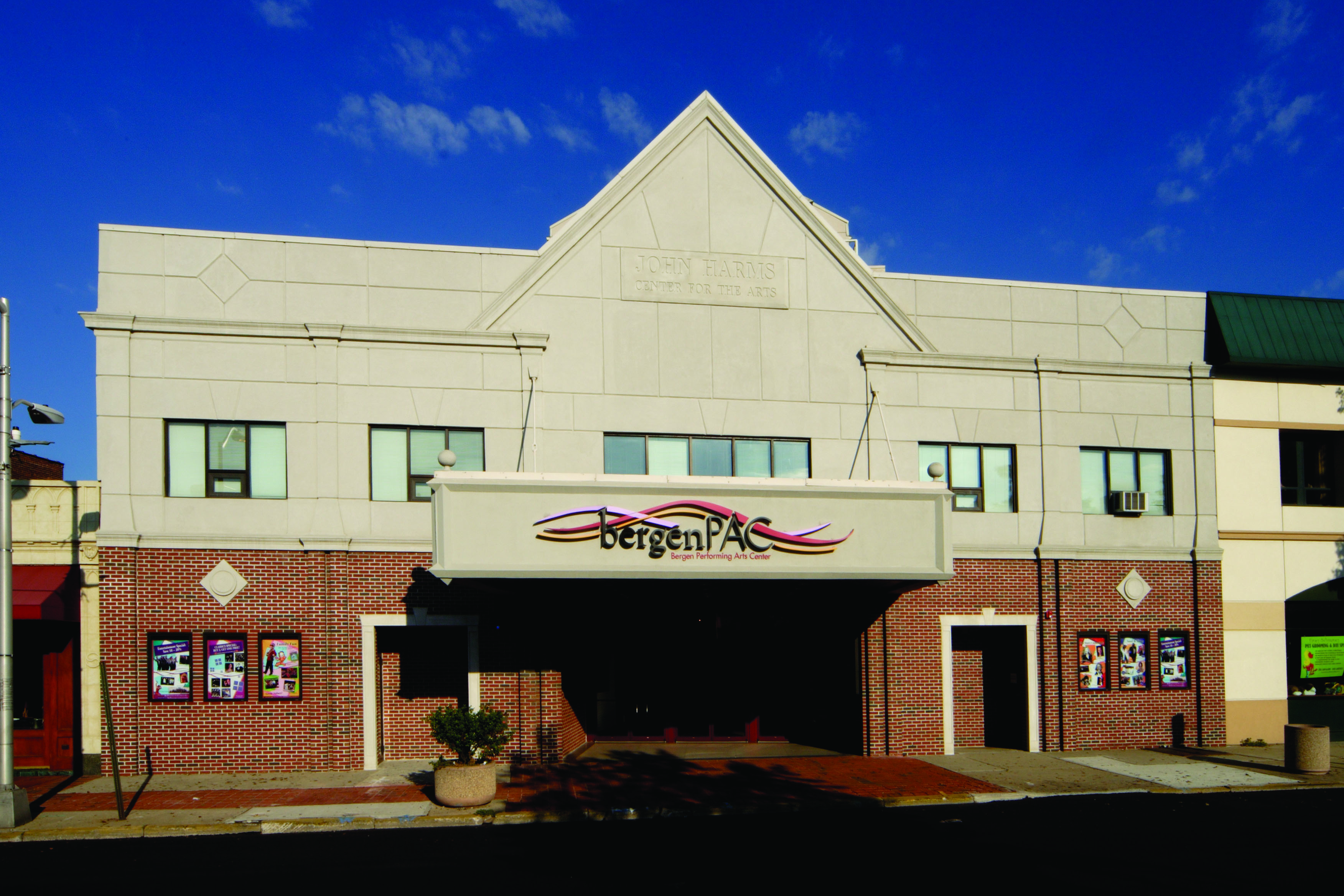
- Bergen Performing Arts Center
- Interactive map of Bergen Performing Arts Center
- Address: 30 N Van Brunt St, Englewood, New Jersey; United States
- Coordinates: 40.89527°N 73.97490°W
- Capacity: Auditorium: 1,367; Drapkin Cabaret & Lounge: 42/60/80; Black Box Theater: 49
- Type: Performing arts center

Construction
- Opened: 1926
- Reopened: 2004

Website
- www.bergenpac.org

The Bergen Performing Arts Center (BergenPAC) is a not-for-profit theater in Englewood, New Jersey. There are dance, theater, voice, and music classes offered year round at The Performing Arts School at BergenPAC.

== History ==
The theater originally opened as the Englewood Plaza movie theater on November 22, 1926, and remained a theater until the organization United Artists purchased the building in 1967, keeping its doors open through 1973. For a few years following the Plaza's closing, the building remained vacant until a small group of local citizens under the leadership of John Harms worked to bring the John Harms Center to life on October 10, 1976, when Russian pianist Lazar Berman performed at its debut. John Harms, (1906-1981) an organist and teacher, began his career as an impresario in 1941, arranging concert appearances in North Jersey of both famous and lesser-known artists. A one-man operation, he selected and booked performers, rented the performance space, wrote press releases, and personally telephoned or corralled over 1,200 contacts. His dream of acquiring and running a concert hall of his own became a reality when The Englewood Plaza came on the market. In the 1990s, two major renovation projects turned the Plaza into a modern concert hall and media facility, while simultaneously preserving the vintage acoustics. The John Harms Center was one of the largest performing arts centers in New Jersey and the largest arts center in northern New Jersey until its closing on April 14, 2003. On April 30, 2003, through a public-private partnership, a small group of individuals reopened the doors as BergenPAC.

== Programming ==
Since the opening of BergenPAC's doors, a number of notable artists have appeared on the mainstage, including Tony Bennett, Aretha Franklin, Diana Ross, Ringo Starr, John Legend, Jerry Lewis, and Willie Nelson. There are approximately 200 performances throughout the year. Johnny Mathis also performed his final concert here in May 2025 before retiring from touring.

== The Performing Arts School at BergenPAC ==
The former Englewood train station, once used as Bennett Studios, at One Depot Square now hosts BergenPAC's Performing Arts School. Students have the opportunity to perform on both the theater's main stage and throughout the county. Programs extend to school districts and special needs for all ages, ranging from infant to adult.

The program offers classes year round for a number of disciplines, including, theater, art, vocal lessons, and dance for young people ranging in age from two months to 21 years.

== See also ==
- New Jersey music venues by capacity
