= Englewood Route 4 station =

Proposed station along NJ Transit's Northern Branch Corridor Project extension

Englewood Route 4
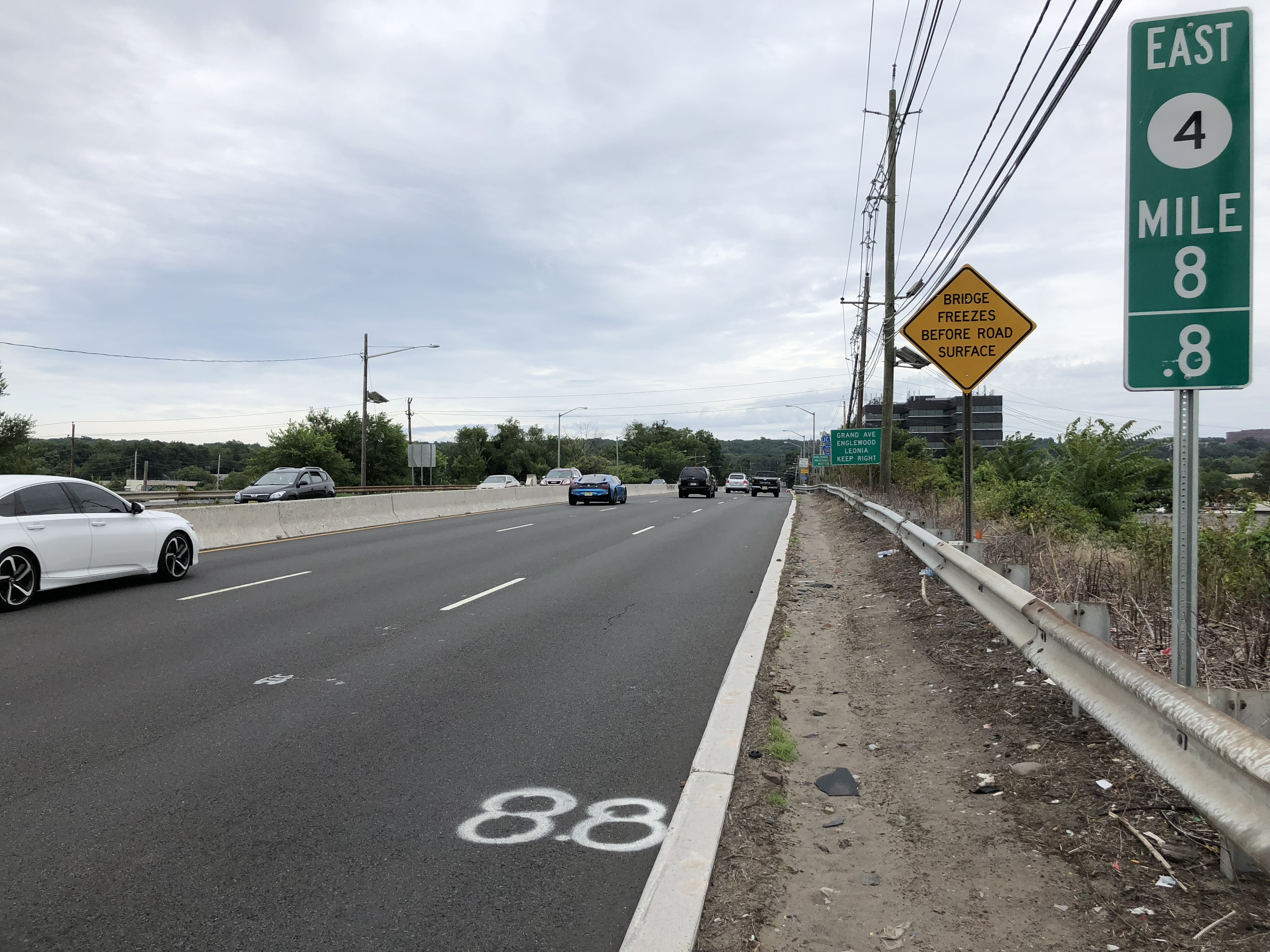
- Route 4 as it crosses over the Northern Branch

General information
- Location: Englewood, New Jersey
- Coordinates: 40.880412°N 73.984530°W
- System: Hudson-Bergen Light Rail station
- Owner: New Jersey Transit
- Line: HBLR Northern Branch
- Platforms: 1
- Tracks: 2

Construction
- Parking: 945

History
- Opened: TBD
Proposed services
Preceding station	NJ Transit	Following station
Leonia toward West Side Avenue	West Side–Tonnelle Northern Branch	Englewood Town Center toward Englewood Hospital
Leonia toward Hoboken	Hoboken–Tonnelle Northern Branch	Englewood Town Center toward Englewood Hospital
Location

Englewood Route 4 is a proposed station along NJ Transit's Northern Branch Corridor Project extension of Hudson-Bergen Light Rail in Englewood in lower reaches of the Northern Valley in Bergen County, New Jersey. The station site is along the CSX Transportation (CSXT) Northern Branch where it runs under New Jersey Route 4 at MP 8.8, east of Nordhoff Place and north of Sheffield Avenue.

The station is designed to have an island platform, partially located under Route 4. It will include a parking deck for 945 vehicles incorporated into a storage and maintenance VBF (vehicle base facility). Vehicle access from Route 4 will be via Grand Avenue (concurrent County Route 501 and New Jersey Route 93). Approximately 6 acres (2.4 ha) of property will be acquired to build the parking deck and VBF. Two other HBLR stations are planned in the city further north of Englewood Route 4 at Englewood Town Center and at Englewood Hospital, the line's terminus.

The area radiating from the station site has been dubbed Englewood South. It is zoned for planned unit development (PUD) and consists mixed-use development that is undergoing a transformation from a warehouse distribution & manufacturing district into a residential, retail, and business neighborhood.

== History ==
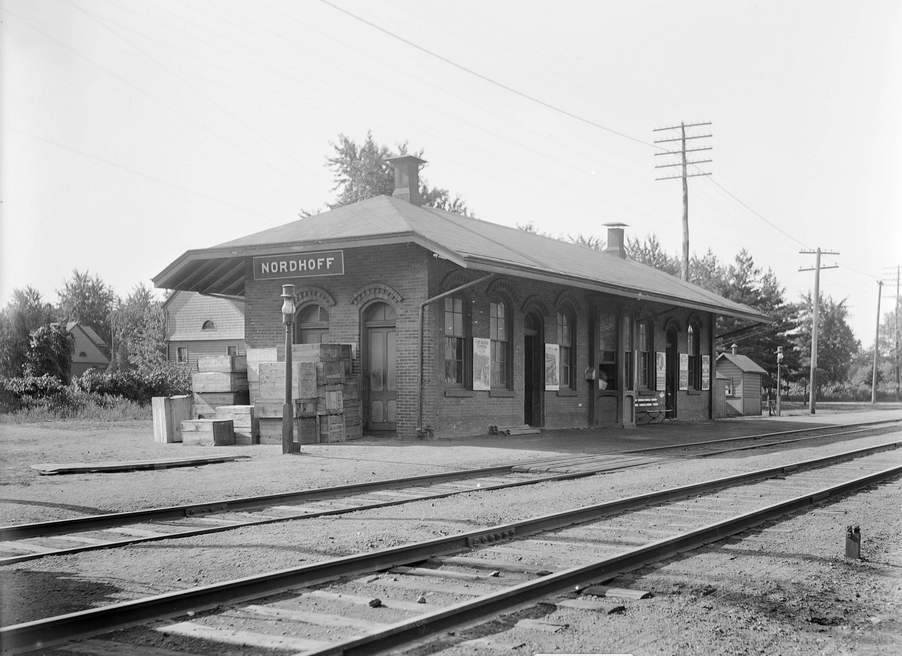
Nordhoff station circa 1900-1910

Rail service in Englewood began in 1859 when the region was still known as the English Neighborhood. By 1887 Erie Railroad's Northern Branch had three stops in the city: the southernmost at Nordhoff (#1919) (later Sheffield Avenue), the central depot at Englewood (#1921), and the northernmost at Highwood (#1923) (later Hudson Avenue).

== See also ==
- Northern Branch (NJ Transit)
