= Hudson Avenue station =

Hudson Avenue station may refer to:

- Hudson Avenue station (Erie Railroad), a former railroad station in New Jersey
- Hudson/Innes station, a light rail stop in California
