= Garret Lydecker House =

Historic house in New Jersey, United States

- U.S. National Register of Historic Places
- New Jersey Register of Historic Places
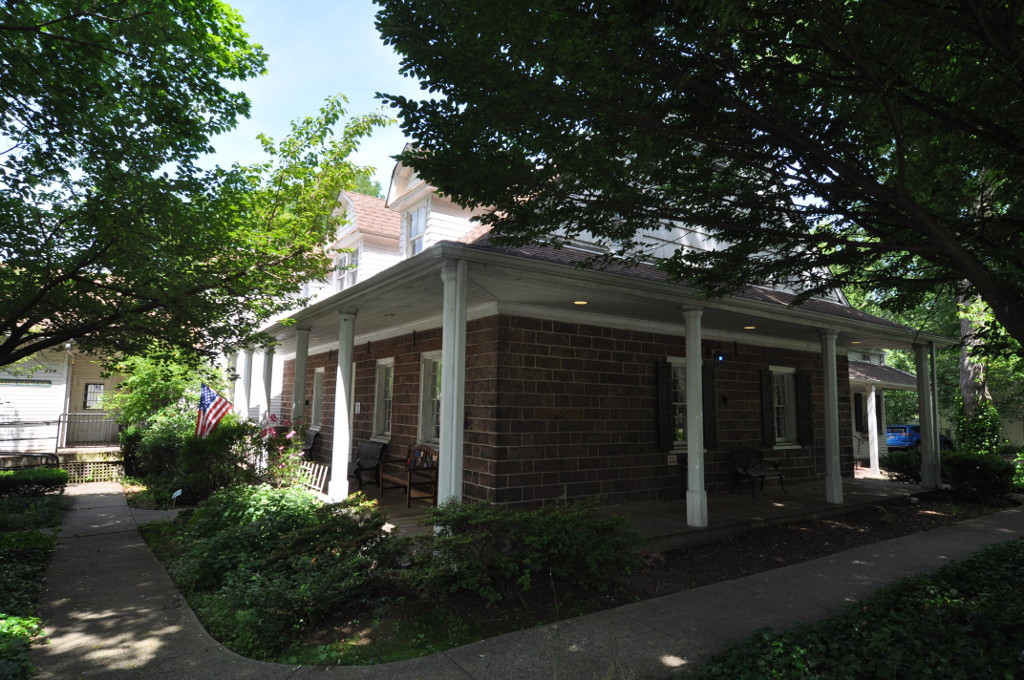
- The house in 2019

- Location within Bergen County, New Jersey Location within New Jersey Location within the United States
- Location: 228 Grand Avenue, Englewood, New Jersey
- Coordinates: 40°53′8″N 73°58′41″W
- Built: 1808
- Built by: Garret Lydecker
- MPS: Stone Houses of Bergen County TR
- NRHP reference No.: 83001530
- NJRHP No.: 474

Significant dates
- Added to NRHP: January 9, 1983
- Designated NJRHP: October 3, 1980

The Garret Lydecker House is located at 228 Grand Avenue in the city of Englewood in Bergen County, New Jersey, United States. The historic stone house was built in 1808 by Garret Lydecker and was documented by the Historic American Buildings Survey (HABS) in 1936. It was added to the National Register of Historic Places on January 9, 1983, for its significance in architecture. It was listed as part of the Early Stone Houses of Bergen County Multiple Property Submission (MPS). It is now part of the local senior center.

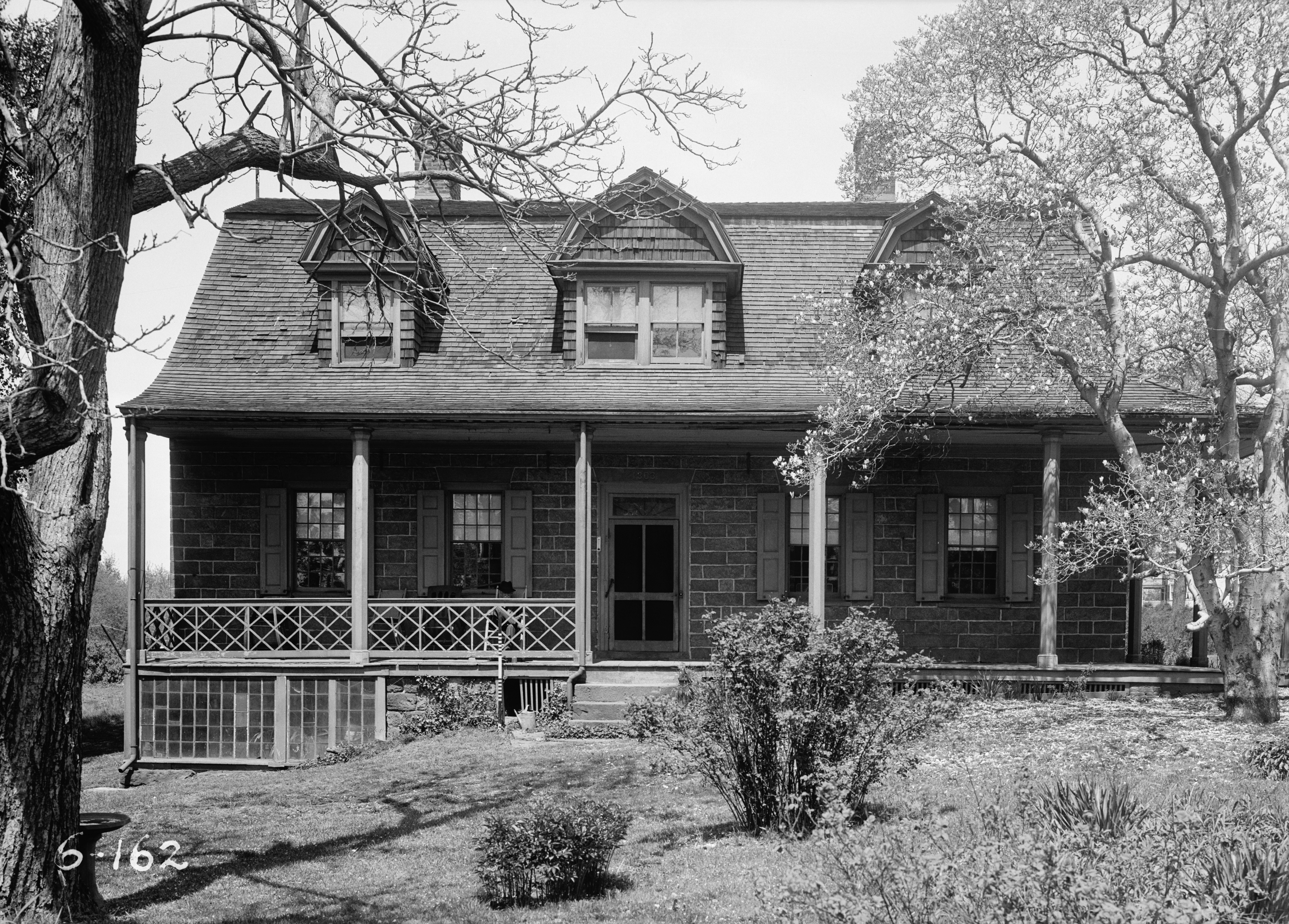
HABS photo from 1936

== See also ==
- National Register of Historic Places listings in Bergen County, New Jersey
