= Englewood Cliffs College =

Defunct private university in New Jersey

Coordinates: 40.72833°N 74.07167°W

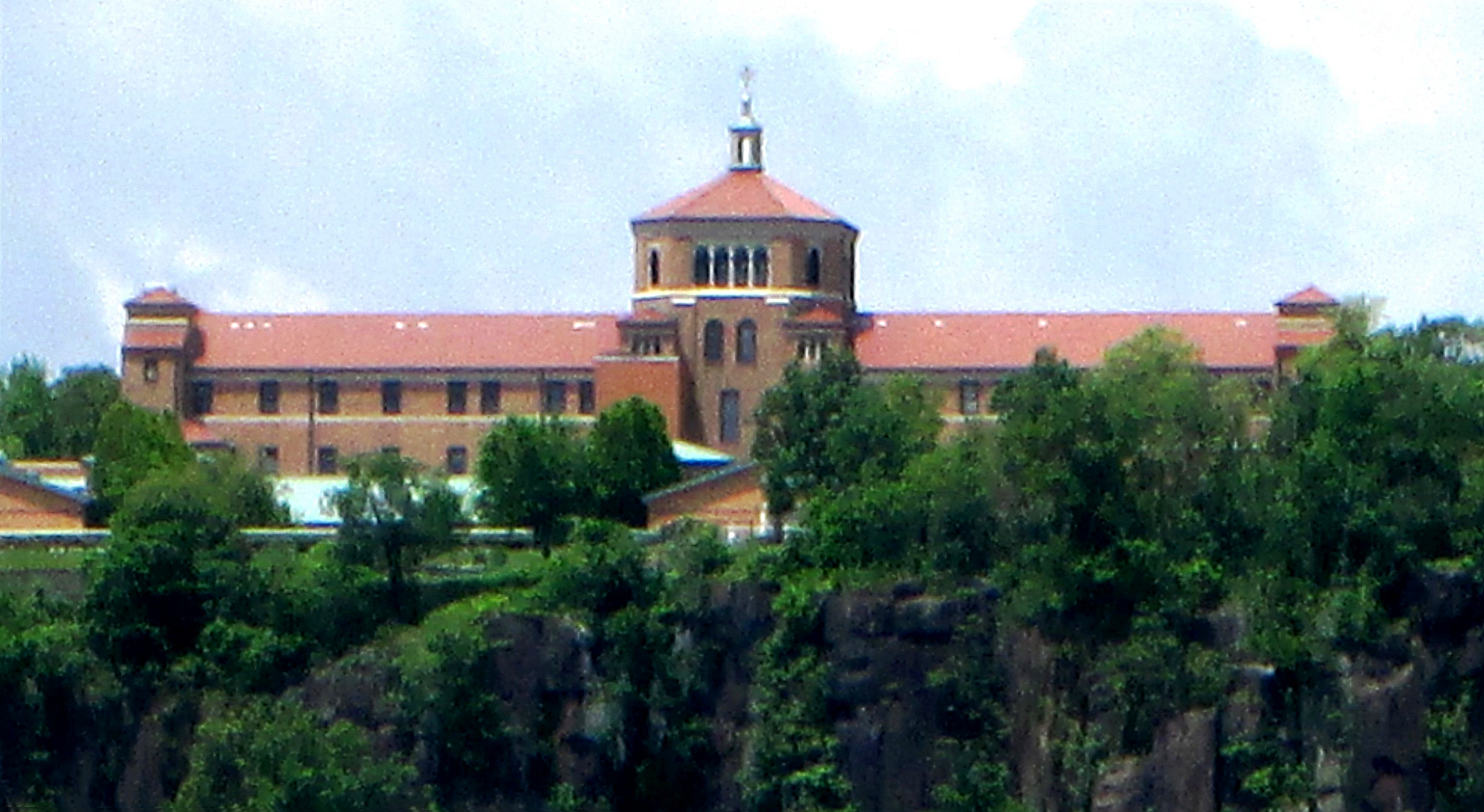
- The college's former campus, as seen from Manhattan
- Motto: Quis Ut Deus
- Type: Private
- Active: 1962–1974
- Affiliations: Roman Catholic (Sisters of Saint Joseph of Newark)
- Location: Englewood Cliffs, NJ, USA

Englewood Cliffs College was a women's college for Roman Catholic nuns and laypersons in Englewood Cliffs, New Jersey. It was founded in 1962 by the Sisters of Saint Joseph of Newark originally as a sisters' college. It closed on June 7, 1974, after its final graduation because of financial problems.

In 1975, the college campus became part of St. Peter's College (now St. Peter's University), a Jesuit higher education institution headquartered in nearby Jersey City.

The school was founded in June 1962 as Archangel College, a junior formation college for Roman Catholic nuns. It was built on the site of the former Palisades Mountain House. Lay female students were first admitted in 1966 and the school's name was changed to Englewood Cliffs College. It became coeducational in 1969. In 1972, faculty members volunteered as instructors in New Jersey correctional institutions.

The college's founding president was Sister Madeleine Crotty, CSJ. She was succeeded by Sister Redempta McConnell, who became acting president upon Sister Madeleine's resignation due to failing health. Sister Redempta previously served as president of San Isidro College, a high school in the Philippines, from 1953 to 1965.

By its final year of existence, Englewood Cliffs had become a coeducational institution; on January 19, 1974, the men's basketball team was defeated by Essex County College by a score of 210–67, a collegiate record losing margin of 143 points.

== Sources ==
- List of closed New Jersey colleges, universities, and schools
- "Closed & Renamed New Jersey Colleges & Universities".
