= Margaret Redmond =

American artist (1867–1948)

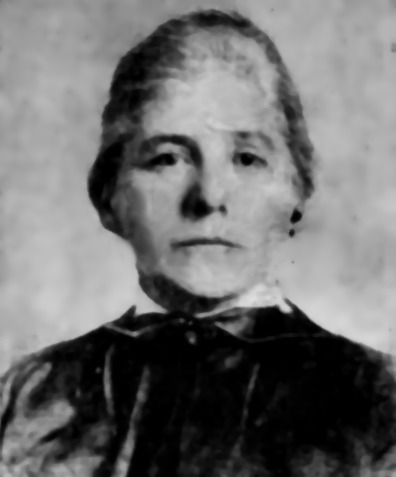
- Margaret Redmond, 1927
- Born: 1867; Philadelphia, Pennsylvania, U.S.
- Died: 1948 (aged 80–81)
- Education: Pennsylvania Academy of Fine Arts, Académie Colarossi
- Known for: Stained glass, Painting
- Style: Medieval revival

Margaret Redmond (1867–1948) was an American stained glass artist. Her work is characteristic of the medieval revival style, inspired by the fourteenth and fifteenth century stained glass of French and English cathedrals. She chose innovative glass materials, vibrant colors and thick leading designs for her windows, favored by the leading stained glass artists of the Arts and Crafts Movement in England. She is best known for her stained glass work from the 1920s to the 1940s, which can be found in churches, museums, homes and libraries from New Jersey to Maine.

== Early life and education ==
Margaret Redmond was born in Philadelphia, Pennsylvania in 1867 and lived in the city until 1905.

She began her art studies at the Pennsylvania Academy of Fine Arts, where she exhibited her work, mostly landscapes and floral studies between 1895 and 1904. She studied art in New York with J. Alden Weir and John Henry Twachtman, both prominent painters in the American Impressionistic movement.

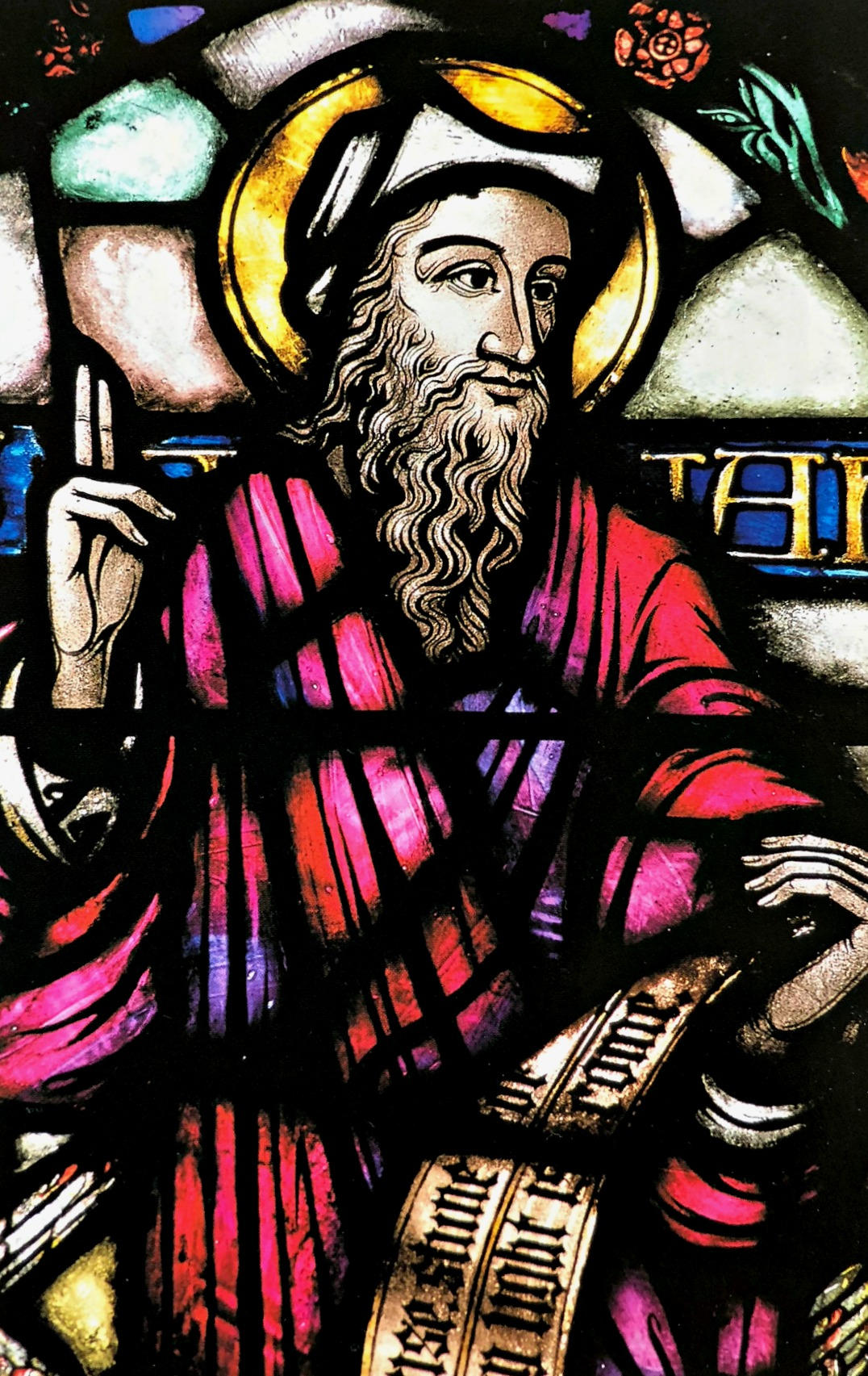
All Saints' Church, Peterborough, New Hampshire

Redmond lived at 10 South 18th Street in Philadelphia, where she also painted, working primarily in watercolors. She bought a farm and old house in Nelson, New Hampshire in 1904, which she used as a summer home and art studio.

Redmond later moved to Boston in 1906 into the newly opened Fenway Studio Building. She studied with influential art scholar, Denman Ross, who was also an early associate of artist Sarah W. Whitman. Inspired by the stained glass work of John La Farge in Boston, Redmond made the decision to become a stained glass artist and craftsman. She developed an interest in the revival of medieval glass, a movement being led by artist, Christopher Whall in England.

After 1908, Redmond traveled in England and France for two years, studying medieval stained glass in cathedrals, parish churches and museums. In England, she viewed outstanding thirteenth and fourteenth century glass, including the cathedral windows at York, Gloucester, Oxford, Cambridge, and Canterbury. In France, she studied St. Pierre's Church of Chartres, Troyes Cathedral and Auxerre Cathedral. The vibrant colored medieval glass, in both England and France, would be an inspiration for her later work in stained glass. In Paris, Redmond took art classes with Lucien Simon and Ernest Millard at the Académie Colarossi.

When Redmond returned to Boston, she worked with Charles Connick, the leader in American stained glass. Under Connick's supervision, Redmond acquired the skills of stained glass design and glazing. She created her first window, a glass medallion, under Connick's guidance. Redmond later joined Connick's studio, working on her own stained glass commissions from 1917 to 1920.

== Stained glass ==
Redmond's style was characteristic of the modern medievalism employed by Ralph Adams Cram, but she did not enter his neo-Gothic brotherhood. Cram's world was a masculine one, and Redmond never worked on window designs for his numerous architectural projects. Indeed, "one mention of Cram's name would set Miss Redmond sputtering," later recalled one of her friends. She added, whether accurately, or not, that in Redmond's view, Cram "would not use her work because she was a woman and he did not believe in encouraging any woman in anything except housework."

"Redmond painted and fired her glass in a traditional manner, piecing together bright mosaics of glass and lead and eschewing the opalescent plated glass favored by artisans such as La Farge and Whitman. The two methods, which had been described and debated in the art press for many years, were still defined as 'English' and 'American', and Redmond, unlike Whitman, stood staunchly with the English". Redmond selected English glass for all her work, mostly antique and slab glass.

With her companion, miniature painter Annie Jordan, she moved to 45 Newbury Street, Boston in 1925, where she kept a studio. At that time, she changed the description in the Boston city directory from "artist" to "stained glass". Redmond would spend summers at her house in New Hampshire, often teaching summer art classes as well as working on commissions.

Throughout her career, Redmond would find doors closed to her professionally because of her gender. With the goal of providing more opportunities for women in stained glass, she trained women as apprentices and assistants in all phases of stained glass work. One of Redmond's first stained glass commissions was a series of six windows of individual saints for St. Paul's Episcopal Church in Englewood, New Jersey. The church also had windows by Louis Tiffany and John La Farge. Redmond created stained glass for churches, public buildings and residences primarily in and around Boston, but her work can be found from New Jersey to Maine.

In 1927, Redmond was interviewed by writer Helen Fitzgerald, of the Brooklyn Daily Eagle in her Newbury Street studio. Fitzgerald described Redmond's workspace as "a veritable treasure trove to the art lover. All about her color glows and flames. On the walls are sketches of colorful places ... and the light transmuted by the stained glass of her own making fills the room with rays of gold and ruby, emerald, violet and blue so intense that it stirs in the sensitive observer an emotion akin to ecstasy."

Redmond exhibited her work at the Metropolitan Museum of Art in New York, the Architectural League, and in exhibitions in Boston and Philadelphia. She was founding member of The Society of Arts and Crafts of Boston in 1897.

=== Trinity Church windows ===
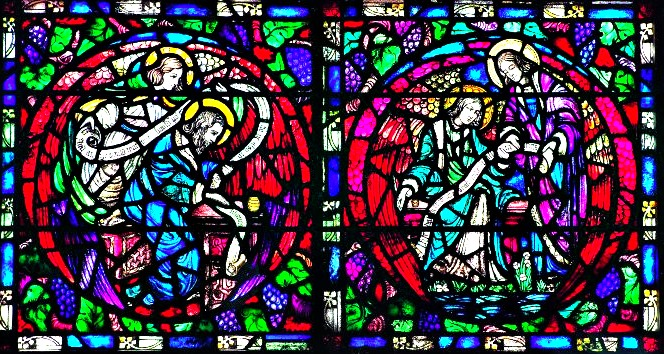
Trinity Church, Boston

Trinity Church in Boston, famous for its stained glass collection, contains works from most of the major American and European stained glass studios and artists of the 19th century, including windows by William Morris, and Edward Burne-Jones, and John La Farge, Only two women stained glass artists are featured in the historic church, Redmond and Sarah Wyman Whitman

Redmond created two stained glass windows for the church in 1927. She was the only woman artist whose work was displayed in the church's sanctuary. In the northwest vestibule, she created a large, memorial window for the Carey family, titled, Solomon and Sheba, and David and Samuel. In the nave are four smaller memorial windows created by Redmond for the Lovering family, titled the Evangelists and Apostles.

In the 1930s Redmond was hired to create a memorial window for the parish house at Trinity church, a memorial for fellow painter, Susan Hinckley Bradley. For Bradley's memorial, Redmond created a tree of life, using large areas of white glass combined with jewell toned glass. The window was installed and dedicated in 1931. The only window at All Saints' Church in Peterborough, New Hampshire that was not created by Charles Connick and his studio, is the Isaiah window by Redmond. The Isaiah window on the west wall of the Lady Chapel portrays "The Prophecy" of Isaiah and "The Betrothal" of Mary and Joseph.

== Stained glass work ==
- Trinity Church, Boston, Massachusetts, 1920's
- St. Paul's Church Englewood, New Jersey, 1920
- Olivia Rodham Memorial Library, 1926
- Children's Room, Public Library, Englewood, New Jersey
- St. Peter's Episcopal Church Beverly, MA, 1933
- St. Paul's Church, North Andover, MA, 1934
- All Saints' Church Peterborough, New Hampshire, 1937
- St. Savior's Church, Bar Harbor, Maine, 1940
- St. Paul's Church, Peabody, Massachusetts, 1940
