= Hudson Avenue station (Erie Railroad) =

Former railway station in Englewood, New Jersey, US

HUDSON AVENUE
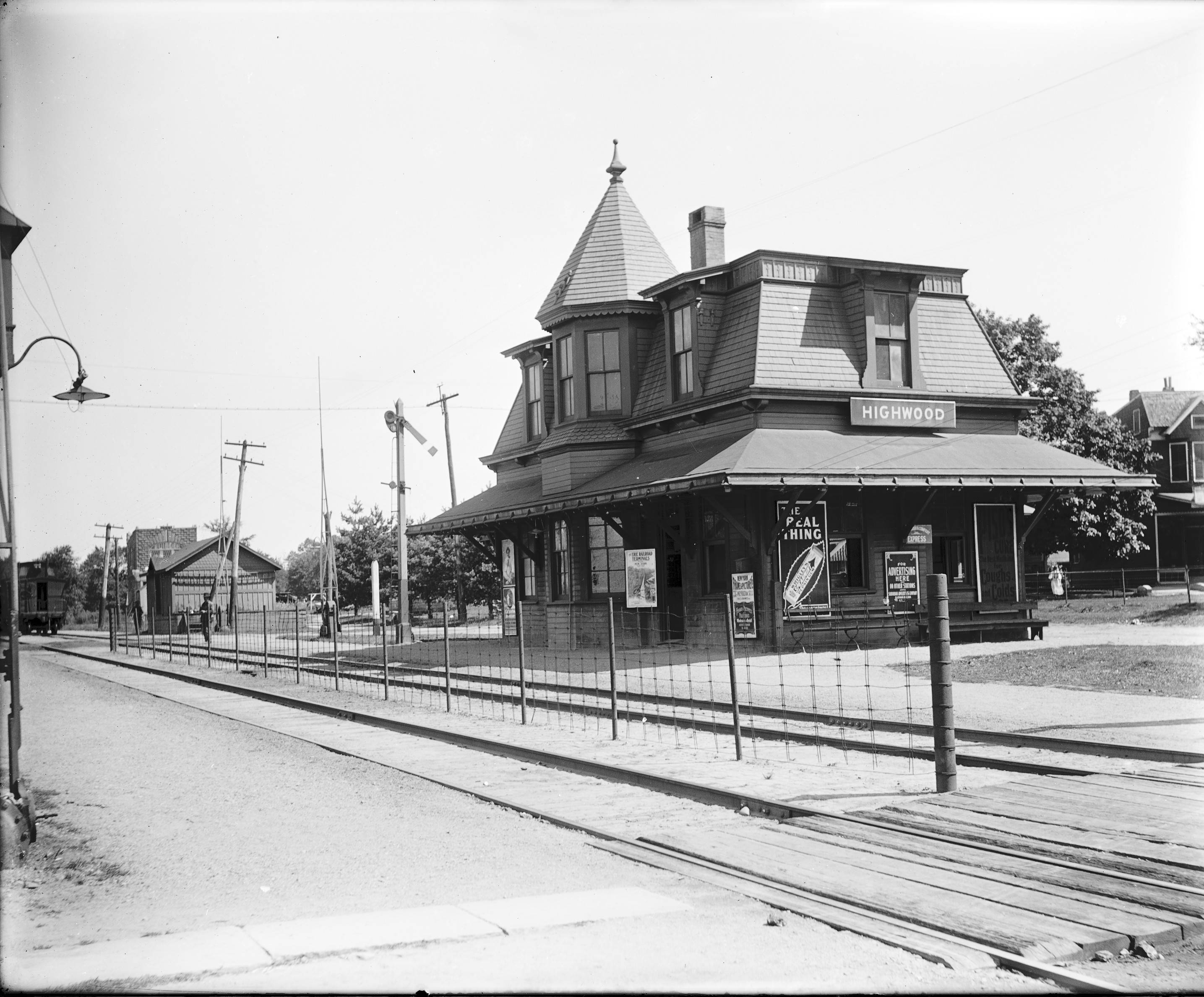
- The former station depot at Hudson Avenue c. 1907–1912, when it was known as Highwood.

General information
- Location: West Hudson Avenue (at Curry Street), Englewood, Bergen County, New Jersey 07631
- Coordinates: 40°54′37″N 73°58′6″W
- Owner: Northern Railroad of New Jersey (1859–1942); Erie Railroad (1942–1960); Erie Lackawanna Railway (1960–1966)
- Line: Northern Branch

Construction
- Platform levels: 1

Other information
- Station code: 1923

History
- Opened: May 26, 1859
- Closed: September 30, 1966

Former services
| Preceding station | Erie Railroad | Following station |
|---|---|---|
| Tenafly toward Nyack | Northern Branch | Englewood toward Jersey City |
Location

Hudson Avenue (formerly known as Highwood) is a former railroad station between Hudson Avenue and Ivy Lane in Englewood, New Jersey. It was once served by the Erie Railroad's Northern Branch. By 1910 the station also served as the Highwood neighborhood of Englewood’s post office. The station is no longer standing.

It was preceded by the Tenafly station (towards Nyack), and followed by the Englewood station (towards Jersey City).
