= Englewood station (Erie Railroad) =

Railway station in New Jersey, United States

Englewood
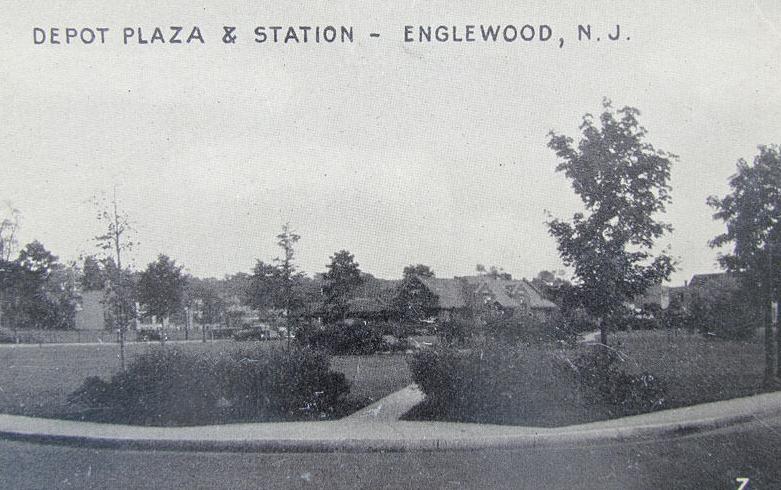

General information
- Location: Depot Square, Englewood, New Jersey
- Coordinates: 40.89527°N 73.97490°W
- Owner: Northern Railroad of New Jersey (1859–1942); Erie Railroad (1942–1960); Erie Lackawanna Railway (1960–1976)
- Line: Erie Railroad Northern Branch

Construction
- Platform levels: 1

Other information
- Station code: 1921

History
- Opened: May 26, 1859
- Closed: September 30, 1966
- Rebuilt: 1898, 1925

Key dates
- September 1925: Original station depot razed.

Former services
Preceding station	Erie Railroad	Following station
Hudson Avenue toward Nyack	Northern Branch	Sheffield Avenue toward Jersey City
Proposed services
Preceding station	NJ Transit	Following station
Englewood Route 4 toward West Side Avenue	West Side–Tonnelle Northern Branch	Englewood Hospital Terminus
Englewood Route 4 toward Hoboken	Hoboken–Tonnelle Northern Branch	Englewood Hospital Terminus
Location

Englewood is a former railroad station at Depot Square in Englewood, New Jersey. Once served by the Erie Railroad's Northern Branch, the building is located in the city's town center along the ROW now used as a branch line by CSX Transportation. The station at Depot Plaza (as it was originally known) was one of the original stations upon opening of the Northern Railroad of New Jersey, which included two others in the town, Van Brunts (later Nordhoff) and Highwood (later Hudson Avenue). The building has undergone various incarnations as restaurants, a recording studio, and a performing arts school. The proposed Northern Branch Corridor Project extension the Hudson–Bergen Light Rail would pass the station along the line.

== Northern Branch and HBLR ==
The station was a stop along Erie Railroad's suburban Northern Branch (NRRNJ) which originated/terminated at Pavonia Terminal on the Hudson River in Jersey City. It stopped being used for passenger rail transport in 1966 (by which time trains had been redirected to Hoboken Terminal). Service continued north into Rockland County, New York.

The Northern Branch Corridor Project is a proposed New Jersey Transit (NJT) project to extend the Hudson–Bergen Light Rail along the line providing service newly built stations along the route. The project has stalled due to a lack of funding. The line would pass by the Erie station and terminate at Englewood Hospital and Medical Center. A station stop at Depot Square is the city’s much-preferred alternative to NJT's proposed new Englewood Town Center Station to the south. A third stop, Englewood Route 4, would be located at the intersection of Route 4 and Route 93.

== Bennett Studios ==
The station building was Bennett Studios, a recording studio, from 2001 until 2011. The 6,500-square-foot studio was established by Dae Bennett, the son of Tony Bennett.

== The Performing Arts School at BergenPAC ==
Since 2013 the building houses Bergen Performing Arts Center Performing Arts School. Students have the opportunity to perform on both the theater’s main stage and throughout the county. Programs also outreach to school districts and special needs groups.

== See also ==
- Tenafly station, a NRHP-listed station along the line
- Demarest station, a NRHP-listed station along the line
- Timeline of Jersey City, New Jersey-area railroads
- Operating Passenger Railroad Stations Thematic Resource
- List of NJ Transit railroad stations

== Bibliography ==
- Van Valen, James M. (1900). History of Bergen County, New Jersey. New York, New York: New Jersey Publishing and Engraving Company.
