= Tenafly station =

Former railroad station

Tenafly
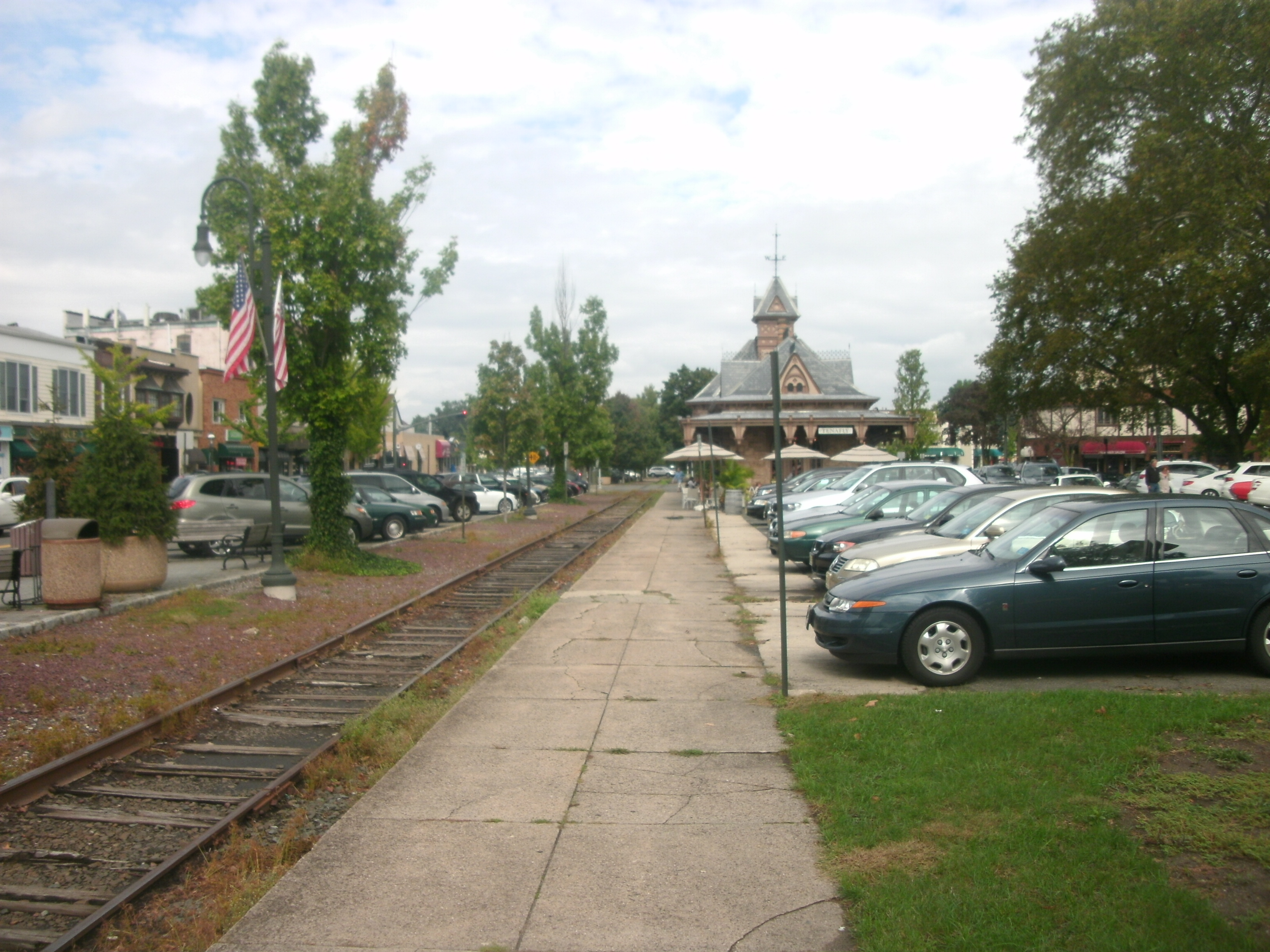
- Tenafly station in October 2011

General information
- Location: 1 Piermont Avenue, Tenafly, New Jersey
- Owner: Northern Railroad of New Jersey (1859–1942); Erie Railroad (1942–1960); Erie Lackawanna Railway (1960–1976)
- Line: Erie Railroad Northern Branch

Construction
- Platform levels: 1

Other information
- Station code: 1925

History
- Opened: May 26, 1859
- Closed: September 30, 1966
- Rebuilt: 1872

Former services
Preceding station	Erie Railroad	Following station
Cresskill toward Nyack	Northern Branch	Hudson Avenue toward Jersey City
- Tenafly Station
- U.S. National Register of Historic Places
- New Jersey Register of Historic Places
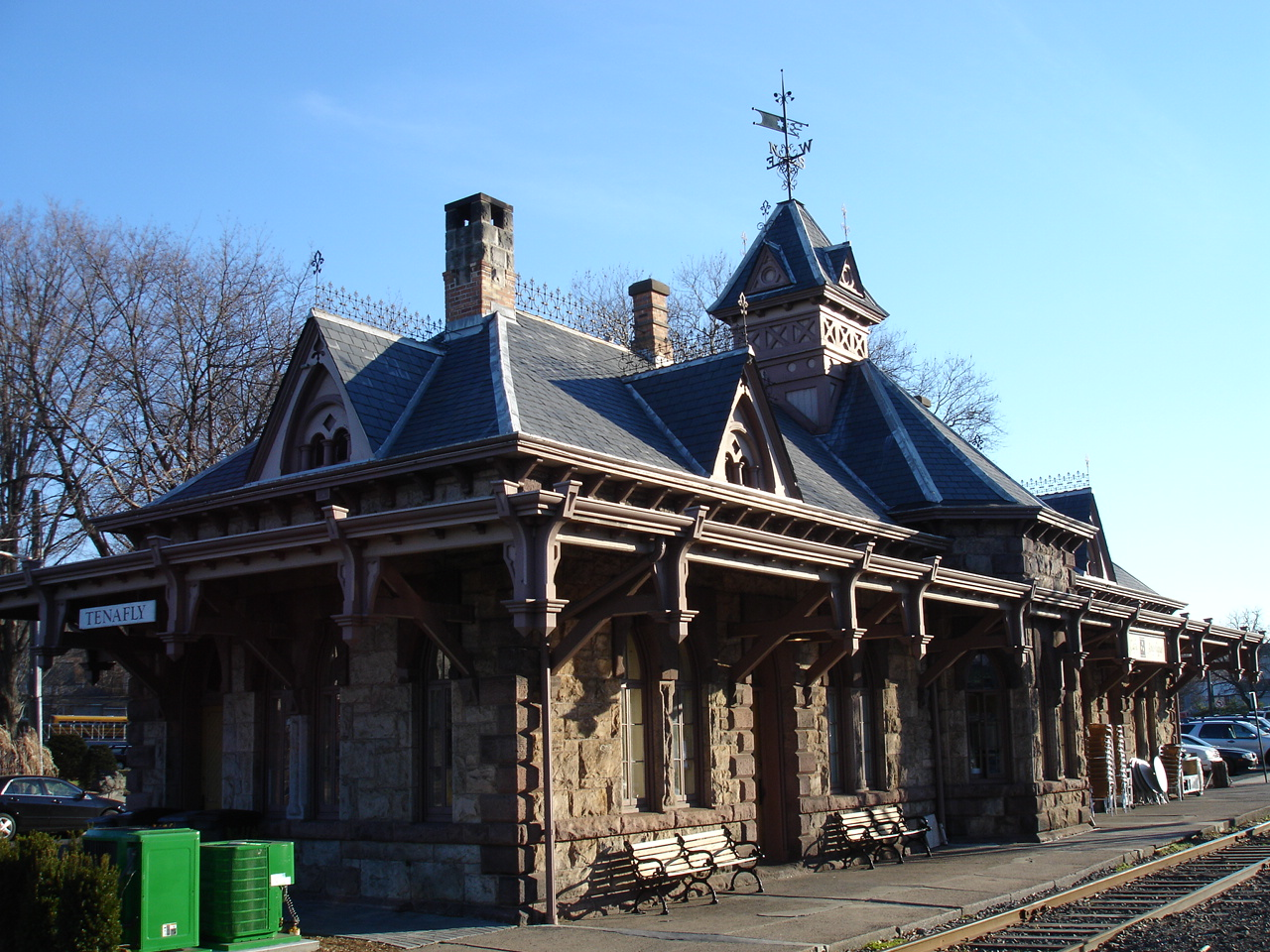
- The depot at Tenafly

- Location within Bergen County, New Jersey Location within New Jersey Location within the United States
- Location: Off Hillside Avenue, Tenafly, New Jersey
- Coordinates: 40°55′29″N 73°57′52″W
- Area: 0.5 acres (0.2 ha)
- Built: 1874
- Architect: Daniel Topping Atwood
- Architectural style: Gothic
- NRHP reference No.: 79001476
- NJRHP No.: 707

Significant dates
- Added to NRHP: January 25, 1979
- Designated NJRHP: November 27, 1978
Location

Tenafly is a former railroad station located in Tenafly, Bergen County, New Jersey, United States. The station was a stop along Erie Railroad's suburban Northern Branch (NRRNJ) which terminated at Pavonia Terminal on the Hudson River. It stopped being used for passenger rail transport in 1966, by which time trains had been redirected to Hoboken Terminal. The rail line is still used for freight transport by CSX.

The Northern Branch Corridor Project is a proposed New Jersey Transit project to extend the Hudson–Bergen Light Rail along the line, restoring service to the landmark and other stations along the route. In a non-binding referendum in January 2011, citizens of Tenafly rejected the idea of the town being the northern terminus of the project. Completed in 1874, the station was added to the National Register of Historic Places on January 25, 1979, for its significance in architecture, commerce, social history, and transportation. It was designed by Daniel Topping Atwood, an architect from New York City.

The station building currently houses a restaurant.

== See also ==
- National Register of Historic Places listings in Bergen County, New Jersey
- Englewood station (Erie Railroad)
- Demarest station, a NRHP-listed station along the line
- Timeline of Jersey City, New Jersey-area railroads
- Operating Passenger Railroad Stations Thematic Resource
- List of NJ Transit railroad stations
