= Demarest station =

Station in Demarest, New Jersey, U.S.

Demarest
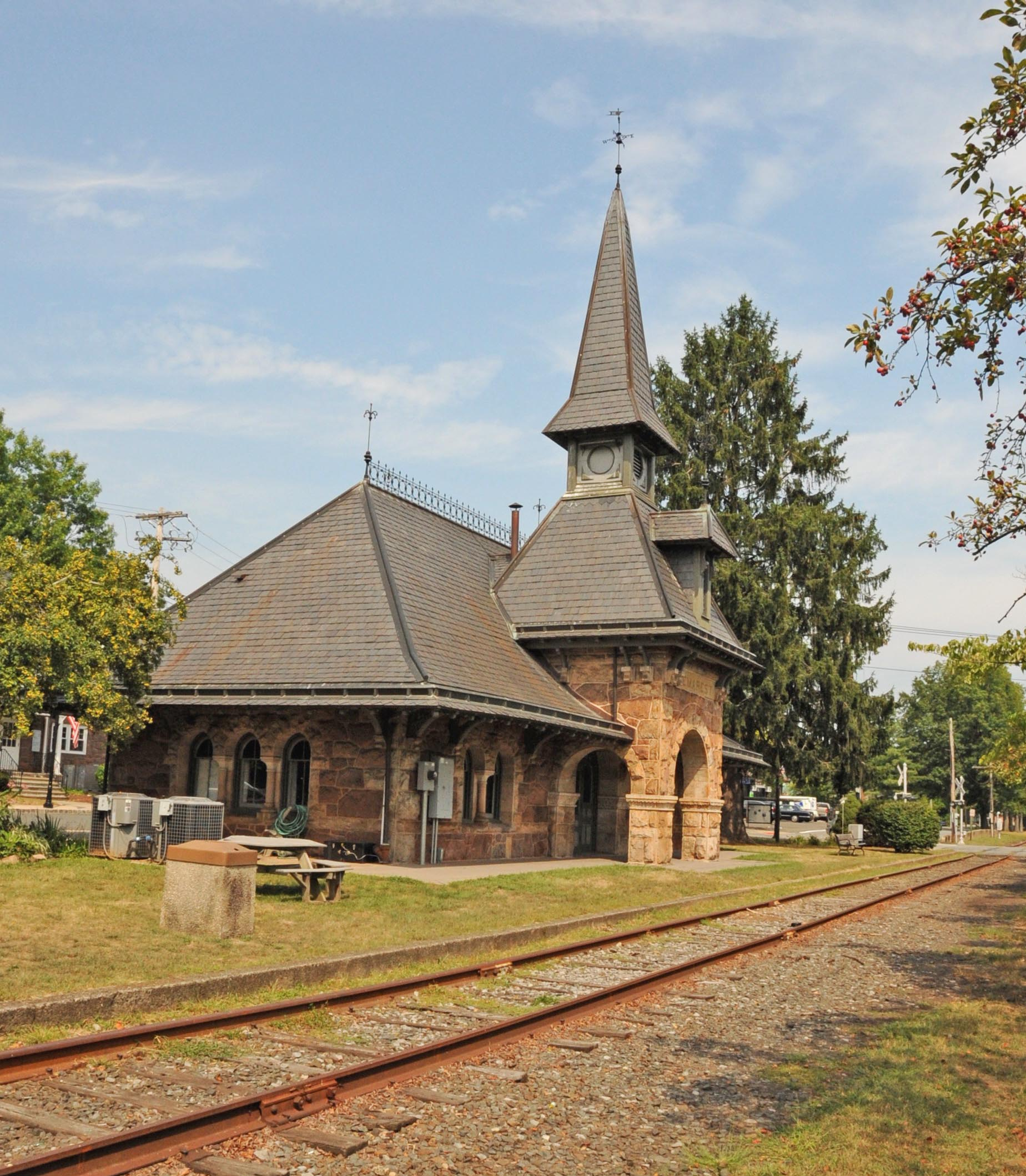
- The former Demarest station

General information
- Location: 38 Park Street, Demarest, New Jersey
- Owner: Northern Railroad of New Jersey (1859–1942); Erie Railroad (1942–1960); Erie Lackawanna Railway (1960–1976)
- Line: Erie Railroad Northern Branch

Construction
- Platform levels: 1

Other information
- Station code: 1924

History
- Opened: May 26, 1859
- Closed: September 30, 1966
- Rebuilt: 1872

Former services
Preceding station	Erie Railroad	Following station
Closter toward Nyack	Northern Branch	Cresskill toward Jersey City
- Demarest Railroad Depot
- U.S. National Register of Historic Places
- New Jersey Register of Historic Places
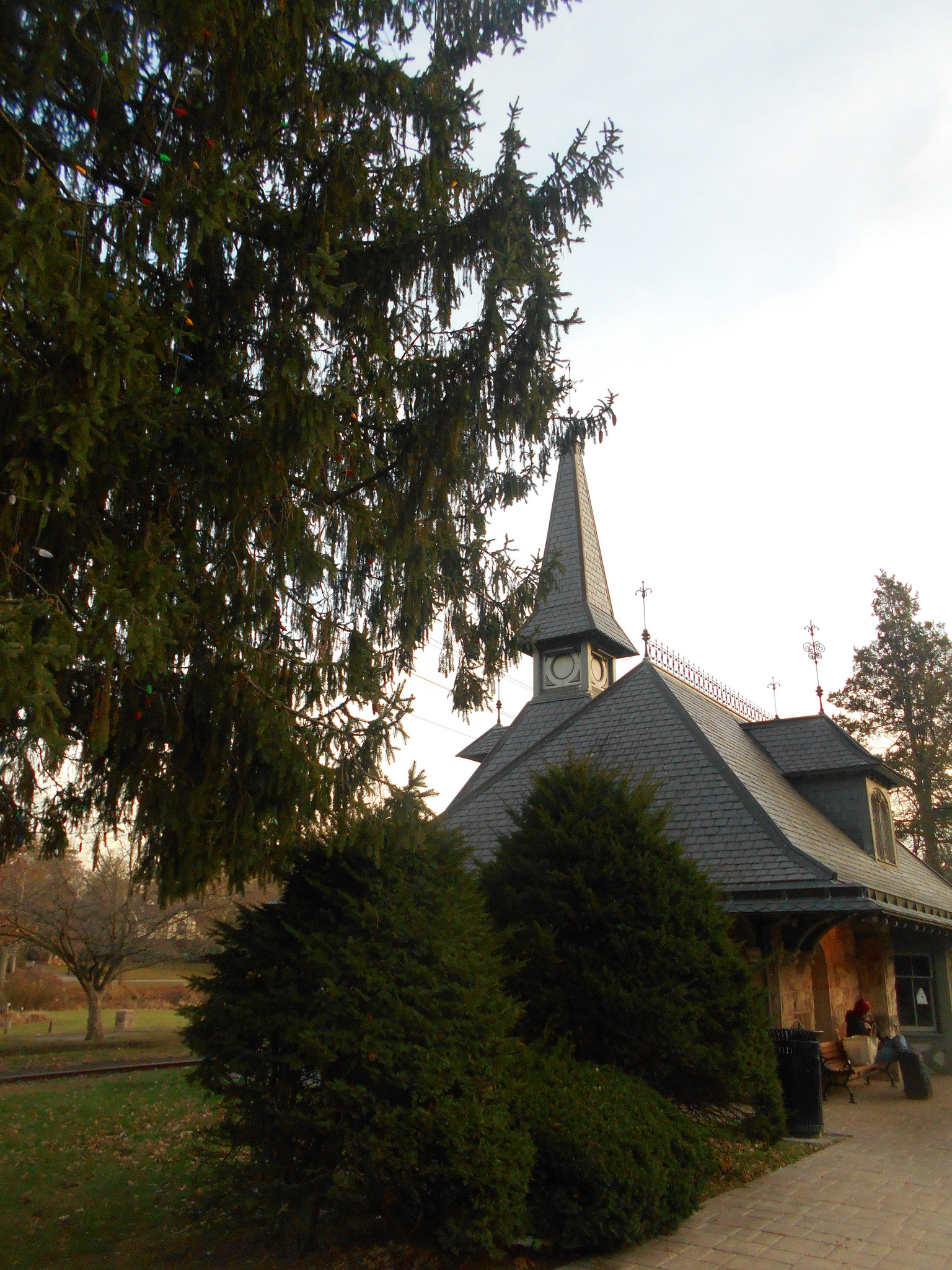
- Demarest station in December 2014.

- Location within Bergen County, New Jersey Location within New Jersey Location within the United States
- Location: 38 Park Street, Demarest, New Jersey
- Coordinates: 40°57′24″N 73°57′48″W
- Area: 0.2 acres (0.08 ha)
- Built: 1872
- Architect: J. Cleaveland Cady
- Architectural style: Romanesque
- NRHP reference No.: 04000671
- NJRHP No.: 3560

Significant dates
- Added to NRHP: July 7, 2004
- Designated NJRHP: May 13, 2004
Location

Demarest station is located in Demarest, Bergen County, New Jersey, United States. The station's depot was added to the National Register of Historic Places on July 7, 2004.

== History ==
The station was designed by architect J. Cleaveland Cady and built in 1872 on the Northern Railroad of New Jersey line. The station was named after State Senator Ralph S. Demarest, who was a director of the railroad and owned the land that the station was built upon. The borough of Demarest took the name when incorporated in 1903. The depot was purchased by the borough of Demarest in 1977 and is used as a senior center. The Demarest Historical Society also uses the depot.

The depot is currently undergoing the final stage of a renovation that started in 2002.

Passenger service for the station ended in 1966. The rail line is no longer in use.

== See also ==
- National Register of Historic Places listings in Bergen County, New Jersey
- Englewood station (Erie Railroad)
- Tenafly station, a NRHP-listed station along the line
- Timeline of Jersey City, New Jersey-area railroads
- Operating Passenger Railroad Stations Thematic Resource
- List of NJ Transit railroad stations
