= Palisades Mountain House =

Former hotel in New Jersey, US

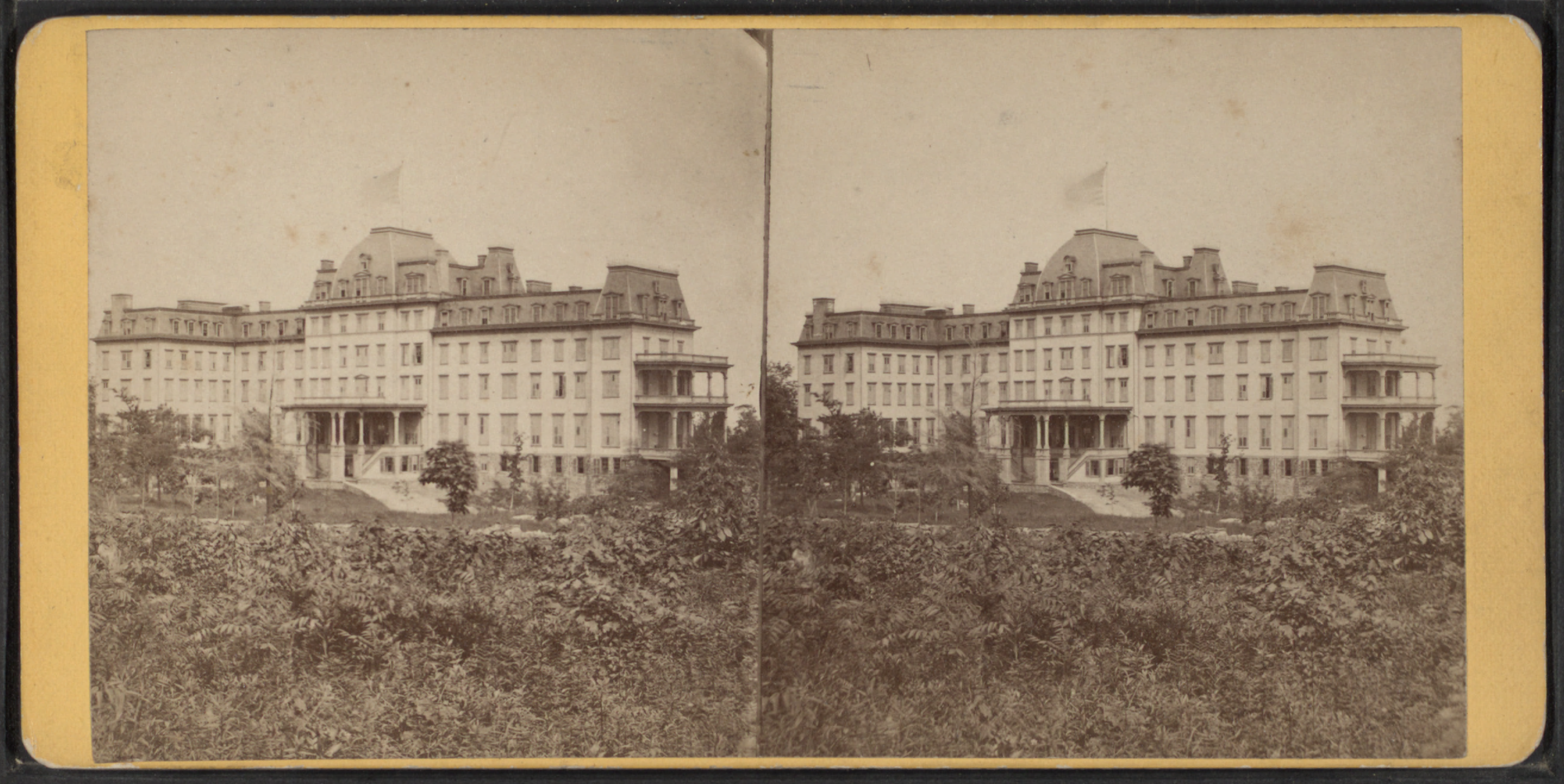
- West front c. 1875.
- Interactive map of the Palisades Mountain House area

General information
- Architectural style: Victorian
- Location: Englewood Cliffs, New Jersey
- Coordinates: 40°52′28″N 73°56′57″W
- Construction started: 7 June 1860
- Demolished: 3 June 1884

Technical details
- Floor count: 5
- Floor area: 600 feet (180 m)

The Palisades Mountain House was a hotel located atop The Palisades in Englewood Cliffs, New Jersey during the late 19th century. It was destroyed by fire in 1884.

== Subsequent development ==
The site of the former Palisades Mountain House became Archangel College in June 1962. It was renamed Englewood Cliffs College in 1966. In 1975, it became part of St. Peter's College (now Saint Peter's University).

== Sources ==
- Davis, E. Emery; Nelsen, Eric (2007). "The Gilded Edge". New Jersey's Palisades Interstate Park. Images of America. Arcadia Publishing. p. 127. ISBN 9780738549729.
- Adams, Arthur G. (1996). "New York City and the New Jersey Palisades". The Hudson River Guidebook: On the Raising of the Body (2 ed.). Fordham University Press. p. 430. ISBN 9780823216796.
- Steeples, Douglass W. (2002). "Man of Enterprise". Advocate for American enterprise. Greenwood Publishing Group. ISBN 9780313321023.
