= Englewood, New Jersey =

City in Bergen County, New Jersey, US

- City
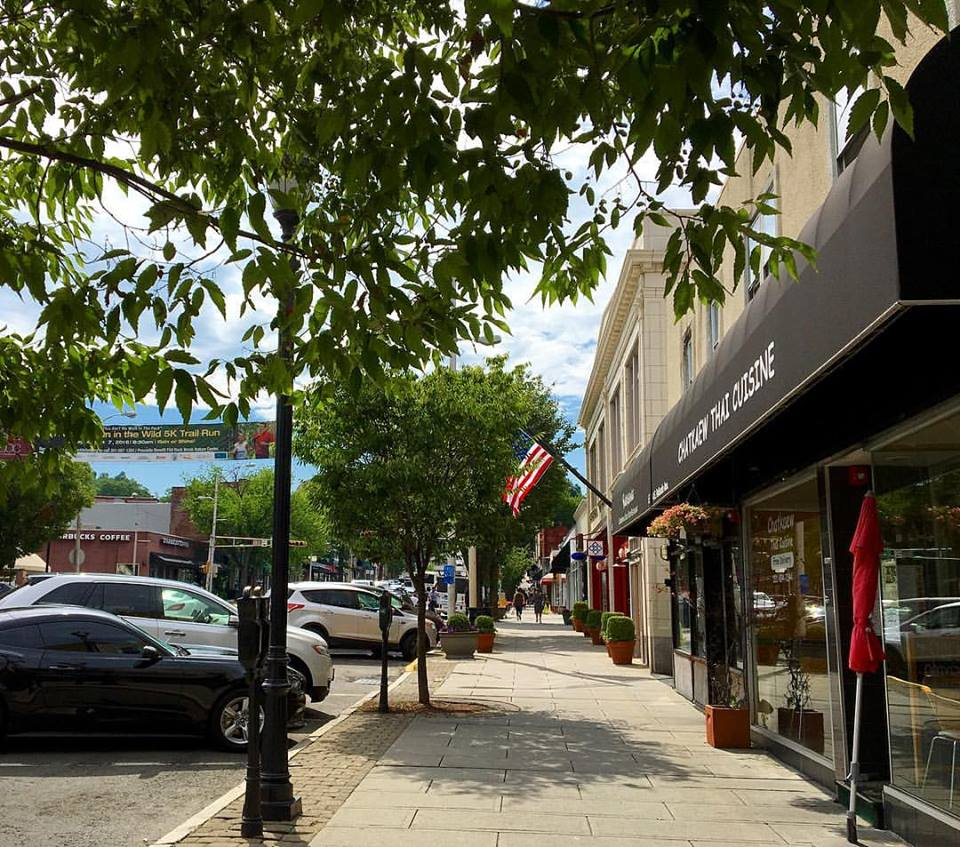
- Downtown Englewood

- Seal

- Location of Englewood in Bergen County highlighted in red (left). Inset map: Location of Bergen County in New Jersey highlighted in orange (right).

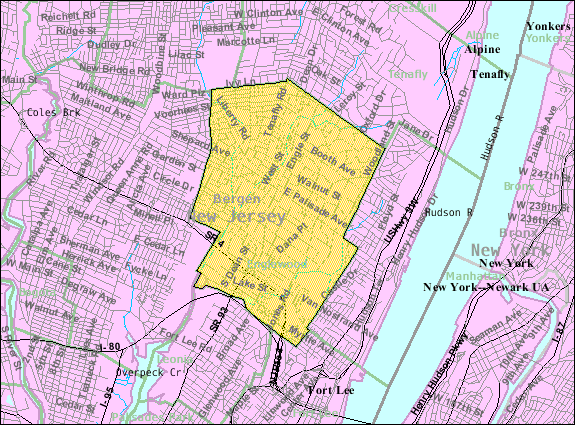
- Census Bureau map of Englewood, New Jersey
- Interactive map of Englewood, New Jersey
- Location in Bergen County Location in New Jersey Location in the United States
- Coordinates: 40.891197°N 73.972515°W
- Country: United States
- State: New Jersey
- County: Bergen
- Incorporated: March 17, 1899
- Named for: Engle family or "English Neighborhood"

Government
  - Type: Special charter
  - Body: City Council
  - Mayor: Michael Wildes (D, term ends December 31, 2028)
  - Manager: Robert Hoffmann
  - Municipal clerk: Yancy Wazirmas

Area
  - Total: 4.95 sq mi (12.82 km^{2})
  - Land: 4.93 sq mi (12.76 km^{2})
  - Water: 0.023 sq mi (0.06 km^{2}) 0.46%
  - Rank: 279th of 565 in state 15th of 70 in county
- Elevation: 43 ft (13 m)

Population (2020)
  - Total: 29,308
  - Estimate (2023): 29,624
  - Rank: 83rd of 565 in state 6th of 70 in county
  - Density: 5,950.9/sq mi (2,297.7/km^{2})
  - Rank: 90th of 565 in state 26th of 70 in county
- Time zone: UTC−05:00 (Eastern (EST))
  - Summer (DST): UTC−04:00 (Eastern (EDT))
- ZIP Code: 07631
- Area code: 201
- FIPS code: 3400321480
- GNIS feature ID: 0885209
- Website: cityofenglewood.org

Englewood is a city in Bergen County, in the U.S. state of New Jersey. It is part of the New York metropolitan area. Englewood was incorporated as a city by an act of the New Jersey Legislature on March 17, 1899, from portions of Ridgefield Township and the remaining portions of Englewood Township. As of the 2020 United States census, the city's population was 29,308, its highest decennial count ever and an increase of 2,161 (+8.0%) from the 2010 census count of 27,147, which in turn reflected an increase of 944 (+3.6%) from the 26,203 counted in the 2000 census.

== History ==
=== Etymology ===
Englewood Township, the city's predecessor, is believed to have been named in 1859 for the Engle family. The community had been called the "English Neighborhood", as the first primarily English-speaking settlement on the New Jersey side of the Hudson River after New Netherland was annexed by England in 1664, though other sources mention the Engle family and the heavily forested areas of the community as the derivation of the name. Other sources indicate that the name is derived from "wood ingle", meaning "woody nook", or that the name was coined anew.

Numerous other settlements in the United States were named for Englewood as settlement in North America expanded westward. J. Wyman Jones is credited with convincing residents to choose Englewood for the city's name when it was incorporated over such alternatives as "Brayton" and "Paliscena".

=== Pre-Colonial and Colonial eras ===
Englewood, like the rest of New Jersey, was populated by Lenape Native Americans prior to European colonization. The Lenape who lived in the Englewood region were of the "turtle clan" which used a stylized turtle as its symbol. 2,000 Lenape originally lived in Englewood, but due to conflicts with the Europeans their population dwindled down to 50 by 1832.

When Henry Hudson sailed up what would become known as the Hudson River in 1607, he claimed the entirety of the watershed of the river, including Englewood, for the Netherlands, making the future region of Englewood a part of New Netherland. However, the region remained largely unsettled under Dutch rule as the Dutch did little to encourage settlement north of modern Hudson County, as the imposing New Jersey Palisades blocked expansion on the west bank of the Hudson.

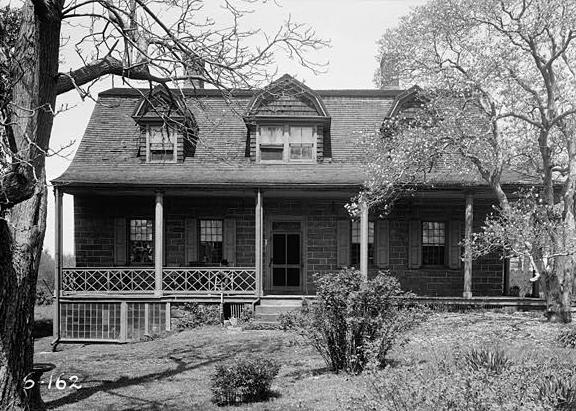
The Garret Lydecker House was built in 1808.

In 1664, after the Dutch surrendered all of New Netherland to England, the rate of settlement picked up. The English were generous with land grants, and many families, not only English but also Dutch and Huguenot, settled the area, which during the colonial era was known as the English Neighborhood. Street names in Englewood still recall the relative diversity of its earliest settlers; Brinckerhoff, Van Brunt, Lydecker, Van Nostrand and Durie (Duryea), all Dutch; Demarest (de Marais), DeMott and Lozier (Le Sueur), French Huguenot; and Moore, Lawrence, Cole and Day, English.

=== Historical notes ===
From 1906 until March 16, 1907, when it burned down, Englewood was the site of Upton Sinclair's socialist-inflected intentional community, the Helicon Home Colony. Associated with the project were Charlotte Perkins Gilman and Sinclair Lewis.

Direct distance dialing, which allowed callers to reach other users outside their local calling area without operator assistance, was introduced to the public in Englewood. On November 10, 1951, Englewood Mayor M. Leslie Denning made the first customer-dialed long-distance call, to Mayor Frank Osborne of Alameda, California. As of that date, customers of the Englewood 3, Englewood 4 and Teaneck 7 exchanges, who could already dial some exchanges in the New York City area, were able to dial 11 cities across the United States by dialing the three-digit area code preceding the local number.

Two years after his graduation from Fordham University, Vince Lombardi began his football coaching career at Englewood's St. Cecilia High School, which closed in 1986.

The Sugarhill Gang recorded "Rapper's Delight" in 1979, the first hip-hop single to become a Top 40 hit.

=== Historic sites ===
Sites in the city listed on the National Register of Historic Places include:

- John G. Benson House (at 60 Grand Avenue; added January 9, 1983)
- Thomas Demarest House (at 370 Grand Avenue; added January 9, 1983)
- Garret Lydecker House (at 228 Grand Avenue; added January 9, 1983)
- St. Paul's Episcopal Church (at 113 Engle Street; added May 5, 2014)
- Demott–Westervelt House (at 285 Grand Avenue; added January 9, 1983)

== Geography ==
According to the United States Census Bureau, the city had a total area of 4.95 square miles (12.82 km^{2}), including 4.93 square miles (12.76 km^{2}) of land and 0.02 square miles (0.06 km^{2}) of water (0.46%).

Unincorporated communities, localities and place names located partially or completely within the city include Highwood.

The city borders the Bergen County municipalities of Bergenfield, Englewood Cliffs, Fort Lee, Leonia, Teaneck and Tenafly.

== Demographics ==
Historical population
Census	Pop.	Note	%±
1900	6,253		—
1910	9,924		58.7%
1920	11,627		17.2%
1930	17,805		53.1%
1940	18,966		6.5%
1950	23,145		22.0%
1960	26,057		12.6%
1970	24,985		−4.1%
1980	23,701		−5.1%
1990	24,850		4.8%
2000	26,203		5.4%
2010	27,147		3.6%
2020	29,308		8.0%
2023 (est.)	29,624		1.1%
Population sources: 1900–1920 1900–1910; 1900–1930 1900–2020; 2000 2010 2020

=== Racial and ethnic composition ===
Englewood city, New Jersey – Racial and ethnic composition Note: the US Census treats Hispanic/Latino as an ethnic category. This table excludes Latinos from the racial categories and assigns them to a separate category. Hispanics/Latinos may be of any race.
Race / Ethnicity (NH = Non-Hispanic)	Pop 2000	Pop 2010	Pop 2020	% 2000	% 2010	% 2020
White alone (NH)	8,389	8,474	8,497	32.02%	31.22%	28.99%
Black or African American alone (NH)	9,887	8,373	7,180	37.73%	30.84%	24.50%
Native American or Alaska Native alone (NH)	37	79	46	0.14%	0.29%	0.16%
Asian alone (NH)	1,356	2,169	2,863	5.17%	7.99%	9.77%
Native Hawaiian or Pacific Islander alone (NH)	12	11	8	0.05%	0.04%	0.03%
Other race alone (NH)	90	99	315	0.34%	0.36%	1.07%
Mixed race or Multiracial (NH)	729	482	760	2.78%	1.78%	2.59%
Hispanic or Latino (any race)	5,703	7,460	9,639	21.76%	27.48%	32.89%
Total	26,203	27,147	29,308	100.00%	100.00%	100.00%

=== 2020 census ===
As of the 2020 census, Englewood had a population of 29,308. The median age was 40.3 years. 20.8% of residents were under the age of 18 and 17.0% of residents were 65 years of age or older. For every 100 females there were 90.3 males, and for every 100 females age 18 and over there were 87.2 males age 18 and over.

100.0% of residents lived in urban areas, while 0.0% lived in rural areas.

There were 10,909 households in Englewood, of which 29.8% had children under the age of 18 living in them. Of all households, 42.6% were married-couple households, 17.8% were households with a male householder and no spouse or partner present, and 34.1% were households with a female householder and no spouse or partner present. About 28.0% of all households were made up of individuals and 11.4% had someone living alone who was 65 years of age or older.

There were 11,563 housing units, of which 5.7% were vacant. The homeowner vacancy rate was 1.4% and the rental vacancy rate was 5.2%.

Racial composition as of the 2020 census
Race	Number	Percent
White	9,857	33.6%
Black or African American	7,649	26.1%
American Indian and Alaska Native	204	0.7%
Asian	2,881	9.8%
Native Hawaiian and Other Pacific Islander	18	0.1%
Some other race	4,979	17.0%
Two or more races	3,720	12.7%
Hispanic or Latino (of any race)	9,639	32.9%

=== 2010 census ===
The 2010 United States census counted 27,147 people, 10,057 households, and 6,788 families in the city. The population density was 5,524.6 per square mile (2,133.1/km^{2}). There were 10,695 housing units at an average density of 2,176.5 per square mile (840.4/km^{2}). The racial makeup was 45.28% (12,292) White, 32.58% (8,845) Black or African American, 0.54% (147) Native American, 8.10% (2,199) Asian, 0.04% (12) Pacific Islander, 9.73% (2,641) from other races, and 3.72% (1,011) from two or more races. Hispanic or Latino of any race were 27.48% (7,460) of the population.

Of the 10,057 households, 28.7% had children under the age of 18; 45.1% were married couples living together; 17.1% had a female householder with no husband present and 32.5% were non-families. Of all households, 27.3% were made up of individuals and 9.6% had someone living alone who was 65 years of age or older. The average household size was 2.68 and the average family size was 3.24.

22.2% of the population were under the age of 18, 7.7% from 18 to 24, 28.9% from 25 to 44, 27.0% from 45 to 64, and 14.2% who were 65 years of age or older. The median age was 38.9 years. For every 100 females, the population had 90.0 males. For every 100 females ages 18 and older there were 86.3 males.

The Census Bureau's 2006–2010 American Community Survey showed that (in 2010 inflation-adjusted dollars) median household income was $69,915 (with a margin of error of +/− $7,291) and the median family income was $87,361 (+/− $9,616). Males had a median income of $58,776 (+/− $7,972) versus $48,571 (+/− $3,984) for females. The per capita income for the borough was $41,533 (+/− $2,981). About 6.9% of families and 10.0% of the population were below the poverty line, including 10.7% of those under age 18 and 15.8% of those age 65 or over.

Same-sex couples headed 73 households in 2010, an increase from the 63 counted in 2000.

=== 2000 census ===
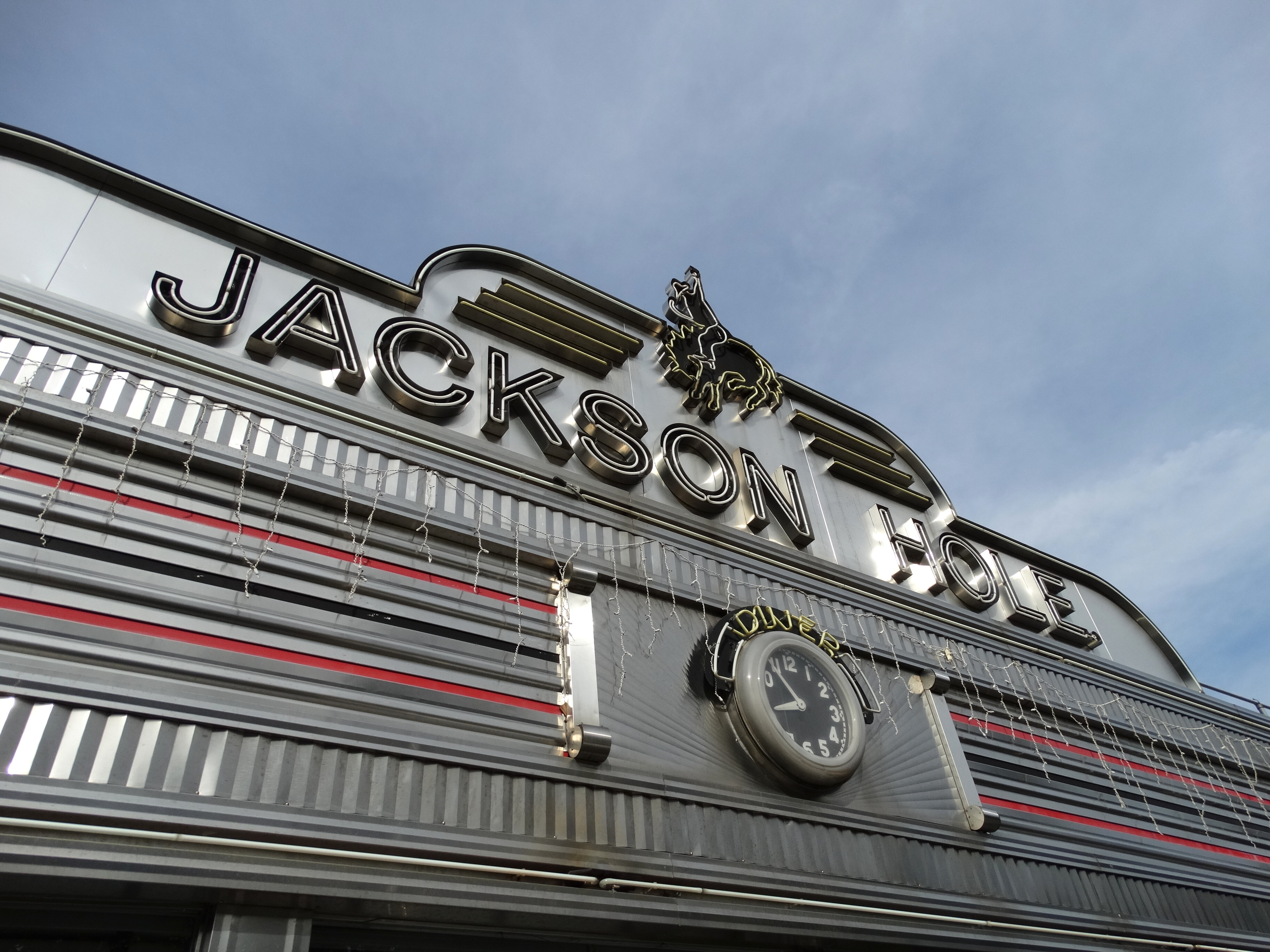
Jackson Hole Diner in Englewood, New Jersey

As of the 2000 United States census, there were 26,203 people, 9,273 households, and 6,481 families residing in the city. The population density was 5,322.0 inhabitants per square mile (2,054.8/km^{2}). There were 9,614 housing units at an average density of 1,952.7 per square mile (753.9/km^{2}). The racial makeup of the city was 42.49% White, 38.98% African American, 0.27% Native American, 5.21% Asian, 0.05% Pacific Islander, 8.50% from other races, and 4.50% from two or more races. 21.76% of the population were Hispanic or Latino of any race.

About 7.17% of Englewood residents identified themselves as being of Colombian American ancestry in the 2000 Census, the ninth-highest percentage of the population of any municipality in the United States.

There were 9,273 households, out of which 31.0% had children under the age of 18 living with them, 47.9% were married couples living together, 17.4% had a female householder with no husband present, and 30.1% were non-families. 24.8% of all households were made up of individuals, and 9.0% had someone living alone who was 65 years of age or older. The average household size was 2.79 and the average family size was 3.29.

In the city the population was spread out, with 23.9% under the age of 18, 7.4% from 18 to 24, 30.5% from 25 to 44, 24.9% from 45 to 64, and 13.3% who were 65 years of age or older. The median age was 37 years. For every 100 females, there were 88.7 males. For every 100 females age 18 and over, there were 84.2 males.

The median income for a household in the city was $58,379, and the median income for a family was $67,194. Males had a median income of $41,909 versus $34,358 for females. The per capita income for the city was $35,275. 8.9% of the population and 6.6% of families were below the poverty line. 10.2% of those under the age of 18 and 8.6% of those 65 and older were living below the poverty line.

== Sports ==
Englewood Golf Club is a former golf club that was located between Englewood and Leonia. It hosted the 1909 U.S. Open tournament.

Englewood Field Club is a sports club that features tennis courts, a pool, and an outdoor hockey rink.

== Parks and recreation ==
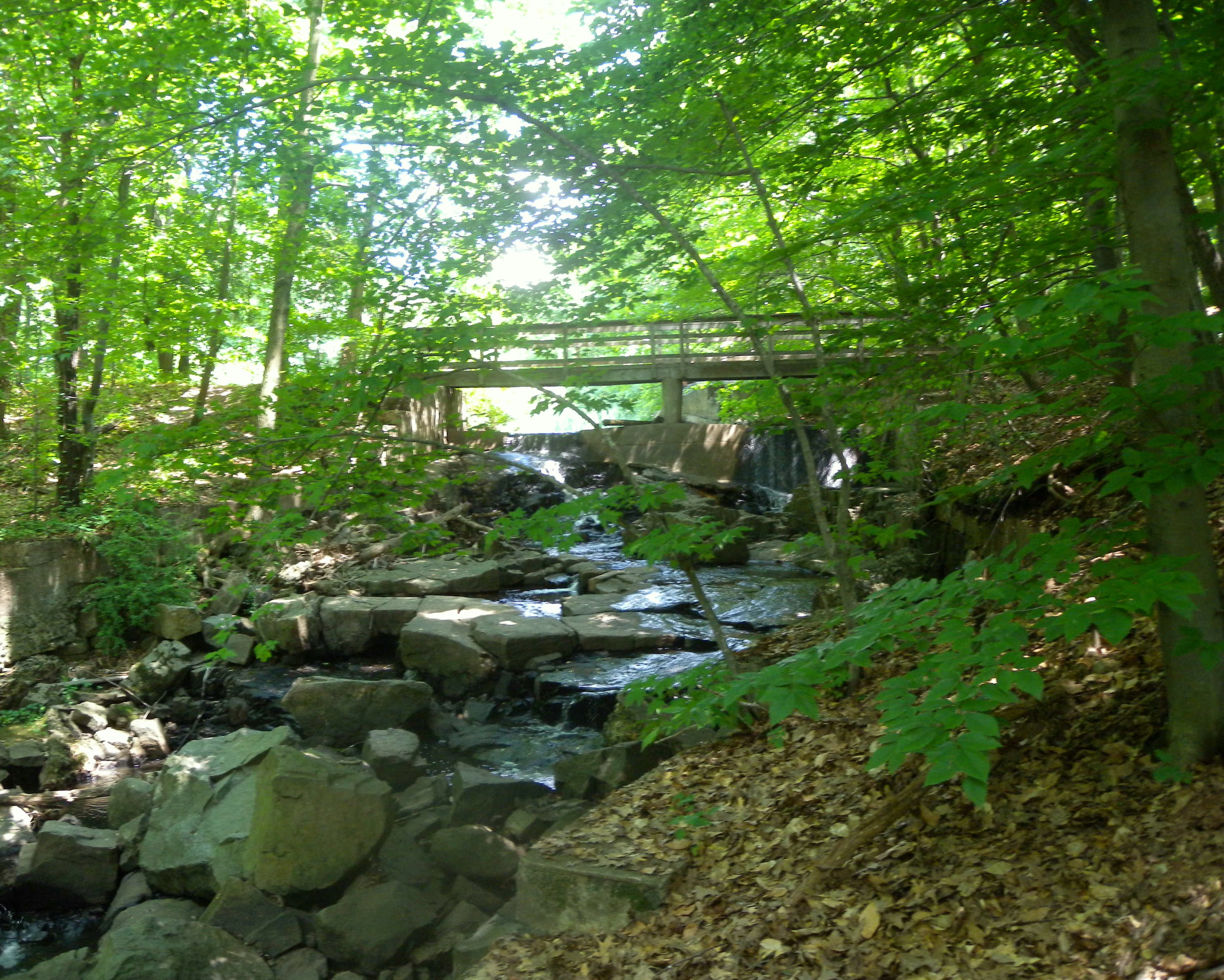
The 150-acre Flat Rock Brook nature preserve is located in Englewood.

MacKay Park, located on North Van Brunt Street, includes an ice hockey rink, a pool, a walking path, and athletic fields.

Flat Rock Brook Nature Center, located at 433 Van Nostrand Avenue, is made up of the remnants of the Palisades Forest. The center, established in 1973, is a 150-acre (61 ha) preserve and education center that includes 3.6 miles (5.8 km) of walking trails and several gardens including the newly renovated Butterfly Garden. Flat Rock allows visitors to learn about the natural ecosystem preserved in the park through exhibits and tours available year-round.

== Government ==
=== Local government ===
In 1980, Englewood switched from a Mayor-Council form of government to a modified Council-Manager plan of government in accordance with a special charter granted by the New Jersey Legislature. The city is one of 11 municipalities (of the 564) statewide that use a special charter granted by the Legislature. The governing body is comprised of the Mayor and the City Council. Under this charter, the mayor has powers to appoint and veto, while the council functions as a legislative body, with some power to appoint and confirm appointments. The city is divided into four wards which are approximately equal in population. The City Council includes five members, each elected for a three-year term. Four are elected from the individual wards in which they live and the other is elected by a citywide vote as an at-large member. Administrative functions are responsibilities of the City Manager. The six seats in the governing body are elected in a three-year cycle as part of the November general election, with wards two and four both up together, followed a year later by wards one and three, and then the at-large council and mayoral seats. Each ward votes in two of the three years in the cycle, once for its ward seat, in the other year for the two positions voted at-large and one year with no election.

The mayor appoints members to the Planning Board, the Library Board of Trustees, and, with council confirmation, the Board of Adjustment. The mayor serves on the Planning Board. The mayor attends and may speak at council meetings, but only votes to break a tie for passage of an ordinance or resolution. The mayor has veto power over ordinances, but can be overridden with votes from four council members. The City Council is the legislative branch of government, deciding public policy, creating city ordinances and resolutions, passing the city budget, appropriating funds for city services, and hiring the City Manager. The City Council meets generally four times per month (except during summer months).

As of 2024, the Mayor of Englewood is Democrat Michael Wildes, whose term of office ends December 31, 2024. Members of the City Council are Charles Cobb (D, 2024; At-Large), Angela David (D, 2026; Ward 3), Kenneth Rosensweig (D, 2026; Ward 1), Kevin A. Wilson (D, 2025; Ward 4) and Lisa Wisotsky (D, 2025; Ward 2).

==== Fire department ====
Englewood Fire Department (EFD)
Operational area
- State: New Jersey
- City: Englewood
- Address: 81 South Van Brunt Street

Agency overview
- Established: 1887
- Annual calls: ~2,200
- Employees: ~60
- EMS level: BLS First Responder
- IAFF: L3260/3263

Facilities and equipment
- Stations: 1
- Engines: 3 (including spare)
- Trucks: 2 (including spare)
- Rescues: 1 (cross-staffed)
- HAZMAT: 1

Website
- http://www.englewoodfirefighters.com

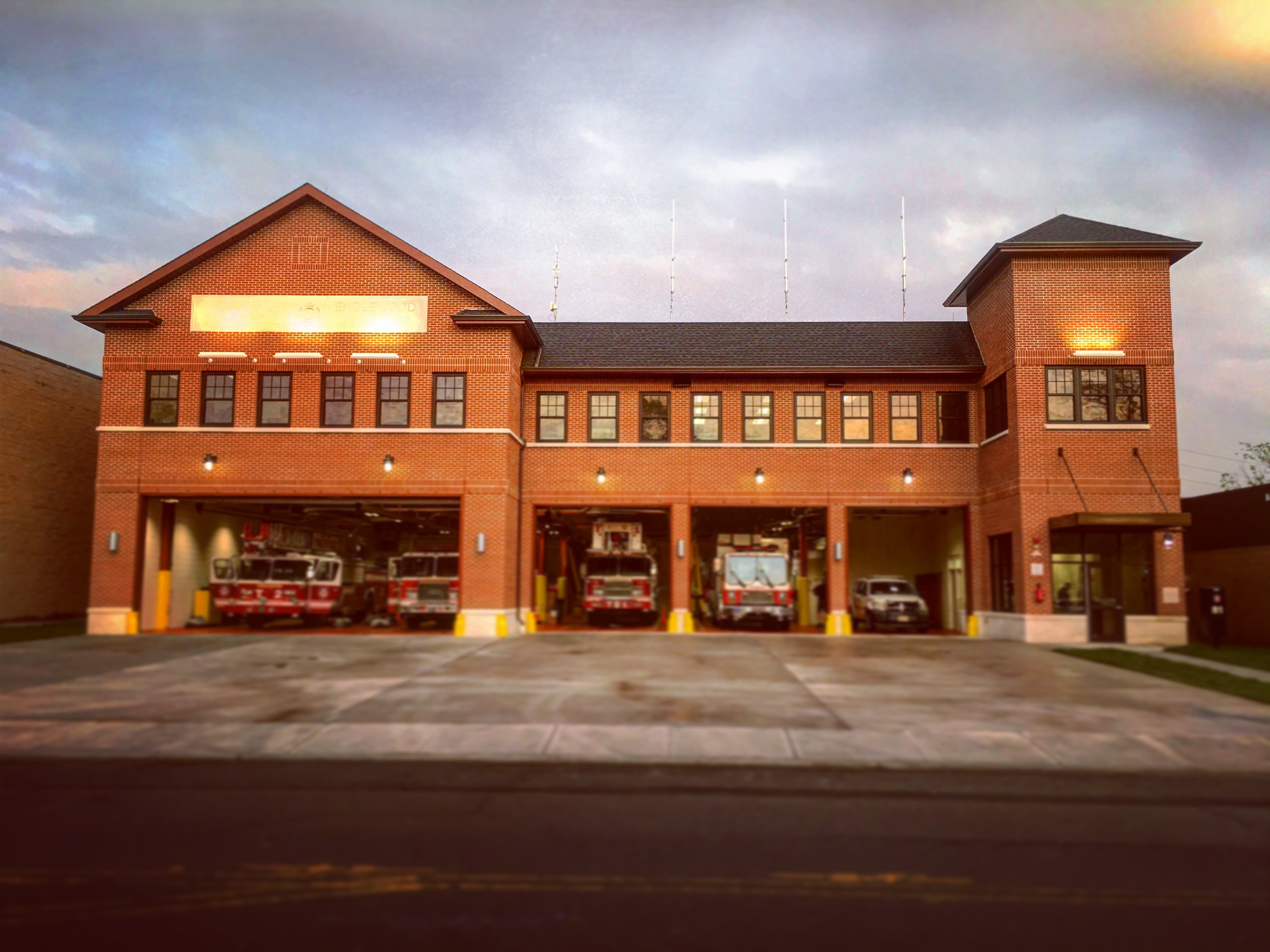
The Englewood fire station

The Englewood Fire Association, a volunteer company established in 1887 as the city's first organized fire protection service, built a firehouse on North Van Brunt Street, near the site of Englewood's current city hall. A professional paid fire department was created in 1912 with the establishment of a Board of Fire Examiners. The fire headquarters constructed on William Street in 1926 was used for 90 years until its replacement by the Jack Drakeford Englewood Firehouse on South Van Brunt Street, which was dedicated on May 14, 2016. The department has a uniformed force of 57 members, including a Chief, Deputy Chief, 4 Captains, 9 Lieutenants and 42 firefighters.

==== Police department ====
The city's police department includes 85 employees, of whom 79 are sworn officers and an additional six dispatchers. After a no-confidence vote against the department's leadership in December 2020, the police union suspended a group of eight officers, seven of them Black, who had supported the chief and deputy chief. The Police Department has had one line of duty death, Sergeant John Francis Crowley, who died of carbon monoxide poisoning in 1975.

=== Federal, state, and county representation ===
Englewood is located in the 5th Congressional District and is part of New Jersey's 37th state legislative district.

For the 119th United States Congress, New Jersey's 5th congressional district is represented by Josh Gottheimer (D, Wyckoff). New Jersey is represented in the United States Senate by Democrats Cory Booker (Newark, term ends 2027) and Andy Kim (Moorestown, term ends 2031).

For the 2026–2027 session, the 37th legislative district of the New Jersey Legislature is represented in the New Jersey Senate by Gordon M. Johnson (D, Englewood) and in the General Assembly by Shama Haider (D, Tenafly) and Ellen Park (D, Englewood Cliffs).

Bergen County is governed by a directly elected County Executive, with legislative functions performed by a Board of County Commissioners comprised of seven members who are elected at-large to three-year terms in partisan elections on a staggered basis, with either two or three seats coming up for election each November; a Chairman and Vice Chairman are selected from among its seven members at a reorganization meeting held every January. As of 2025, the county executive is James J. Tedesco III (D, Paramus), whose four-year term of office ends December 31, 2026.

Bergen County's Commissioners are Chair Mary J. Amoroso (D, Mahwah, 2025), Vice Chair Steven A. Tanelli (D, North Arlington, 2027), Chair Pro Tem Joan Voss (D, Fort Lee, 2026), Rafael Marte (D, Bergenfield, 2026), Germaine M. Ortiz (D, Emerson, 2025), Thomas J. Sullivan Jr. (D, Montvale, 2025) and Tracy Silna Zur (D, Franklin Lakes, 2027).

Bergen County's elected constitutional officials are Clerk John S. Hogan (D, Northvale, 2026), Sheriff Anthony Cureton (D, Englewood, 2027) and Surrogate Michael R. Dressler (D, Cresskill, 2026).

=== Politics ===
As of March 2011, there were a total of 15,033 registered voters in Englewood, of which 8,571 (57.0% vs. 31.7% countywide) were registered as Democrats, 1,215 (8.1% vs. 21.1%) were registered as Republicans and 5,240 (34.9% vs. 47.1%) were registered as Unaffiliated. There were 7 voters registered as Libertarians or Greens. Among the city's 2010 Census population, 55.4% (vs. 57.1% in Bergen County) were registered to vote, including 71.2% of those ages 18 and over (vs. 73.7% countywide).

Gubernatorial election results for Englewood
Year	Republican		Democratic		Third party(ies)	
Year	No.	%	No.	%	No.	%
2025	2,681	30.25%	6,158	69.49%	23	0.26%
2021	1,632	24.02%	5,115	75.30%	46	0.68%
2017	998	17.46%	4,646	81.28%	72	1.26%
2013	1,972	36.60%	3,367	62.49%	49	0.91%
2009	1,613	22.70%	5,304	74.63%	190	2.67%
2005	1,462	20.76%	5,475	77.73%	107	1.52%

In the 2012 presidential election, Democrat Barack Obama received 8,855 votes (76.8% vs. 54.8% countywide), ahead of Republican Mitt Romney with 2,502 votes (21.7% vs. 43.5%) and other candidates with 71 votes (0.6% vs. 0.9%), among the 11,533 ballots cast by the city's 16,586 registered voters, for a turnout of 69.5% (vs. 70.4% in Bergen County). In the 2008 presidential election, Democrat Barack Obama received 9,412 votes (77.0% vs. 53.9% countywide), ahead of Republican John McCain with 2,625 votes (21.5% vs. 44.5%) and other candidates with 58 votes (0.5% vs. 0.8%), among the 12,221 ballots cast by the city's 16,065 registered voters, for a turnout of 76.1% (vs. 76.8% in Bergen County). In the 2004 presidential election, Democrat John Kerry received 8,087 votes (73.6% vs. 51.7% countywide), ahead of Republican George W. Bush with 2,798 votes (25.5% vs. 47.2%) and other candidates with 65 votes (0.6% vs. 0.7%), among the 10,990 ballots cast by the city's 14,702 registered voters, for a turnout of 74.8% (vs. 76.9% in the whole county).

Presidential elections results
Year	Republican	Democratic
2024	32.9% 4,034	64.2% 7,859
2020	22.9% 3,111	76.9% 10,323
2016	17.9% 1,992	79.1% 8,778
2012	21.7% 2,502	76.8 8,855
2008	21.5% 2,625	77.0% 9,412
2004	25.5% 2,798	73.6% 8,087

In the 2013 gubernatorial election, Democrat Barbara Buono received 62.5% of the vote (3,367 cast), ahead of Republican Chris Christie with 36.6% (1,972 votes), and other candidates with 0.9% (49 votes), among the 5,557 ballots cast by the city's 15,615 registered voters (169 ballots were spoiled), for a turnout of 35.6%. In the 2009 gubernatorial election, Democrat Jon Corzine received 5,304 ballots cast (73.8% vs. 48.0% countywide), ahead of Republican Chris Christie with 1,613 votes (22.5% vs. 45.8%), Independent Chris Daggett with 170 votes (2.4% vs. 4.7%) and other candidates with 20 votes (0.3% vs. 0.5%), among the 7,184 ballots cast by the city's 15,534 registered voters, yielding a 46.2% turnout (vs. 50.0% in the county).

United States Senate election results for Englewood1
Year	Republican		Democratic		Third party(ies)	
Year	No.	%	No.	%	No.	%
2024	3,469	30.43%	7,636	66.98%	295	2.59%
2018	1,579	18.00%	6,975	79.51%	219	2.50%
2012	1,791	17.53%	8,315	81.38%	111	1.09%
2006	1,564	21.43%	5,625	77.09%	108	1.48%

United States Senate election results for Englewood2
Year	Republican		Democratic		Third party(ies)	
Year	No.	%	No.	%	No.	%
2020	2,912	22.11%	10,000	75.92%	260	1.97%
2014	961	15.56%	5,154	83.44%	62	1.00%
2013	683	14.61%	3,965	84.79%	28	0.60%
2008	2,074	19.18%	8,642	79.91%	99	0.92%

== Education ==
=== Public schools ===
The Englewood Public School District serves students in pre-kindergarten through twelfth grade. Students from Englewood Cliffs attend the district's high school, as part of a sending/receiving relationship with the Englewood Cliffs Public Schools. As of the 2023–24 school year, the district, comprised of five schools, had an enrollment of 2,955 students and 259.7 classroom teachers (on an FTE basis), for a student–teacher ratio of 11.4:1. Schools in the district (with 2023–24 enrollment data from the National Center for Education Statistics) are D. A. Quarles Early Childhood Center with 431 students in grades PreK–K, Dr. John Grieco Elementary School with 353 students in grades 1–2, Dr. Leroy McCloud School with 481 students in grades 3–5, Janis E. Dismus Middle School with 525 students in grades 6–8 and Dwight Morrow High School / Academies @ Englewood with 1,078 students in grades 9–12.

Public school students from the city, and all of Bergen County, are eligible to attend the secondary education programs offered by the Bergen County Technical Schools, which include the Bergen County Academies in Hackensack, and the Bergen Tech campus in Teterboro or Paramus. The district offers programs on a shared-time or full-time basis, with admission based on a selective application process and tuition covered by the student's home school district.

As an alternative to regular public education, the city is home of the Englewood on the Palisades Charter School, which had an enrollment of 317 students in Kindergarten through fifth grade, as of the 2018–2019 school year. Shalom Academy, a charter school with a focus on Hebrew language immersion, had planned to open for grades K–5 in September 2011, serving students from both Englewood and Teaneck, but failed to receive final approval from the New Jersey Department of Education.

=== Private schools ===
Englewood is the home to a number of private schools. Dwight-Englewood School serves 900 students in pre-kindergarten through twelfth grade, housed in three separate divisions. Founded in 1930, Elisabeth Morrow School serves students almost 400 students in preschool through eighth grade. Moriah School of Englewood, one of the county's largest, is a Jewish day school with an enrollment that had been as high as 1,000 students in preschool through eighth grade. Yeshiva Ohr Simcha serves students in high school for grades 9–12 and offers a postgraduate yeshiva program.

In the face of a declining enrollment, St. Cecilia Interparochial School was closed by the Roman Catholic Archdiocese of Newark at the end of the 2010–2011 school year, with an expected student body of 85 students for K–8 in the following year constituting less than half of the number of students needed to keep the school financially viable. St. Cecilia High School, where Vince Lombardi coached football 1939–1947, had been closed in 1986.

== Healthcare ==
- Englewood Hospital and Medical Center, located on Engle Street, is known for its cardiac, bloodless surgery and breast care programs.
- Lillian Booth Actors Home is an assisted-living facility that assists entertainment and performing arts professionals.

== Transportation ==
=== Roads and highways ===
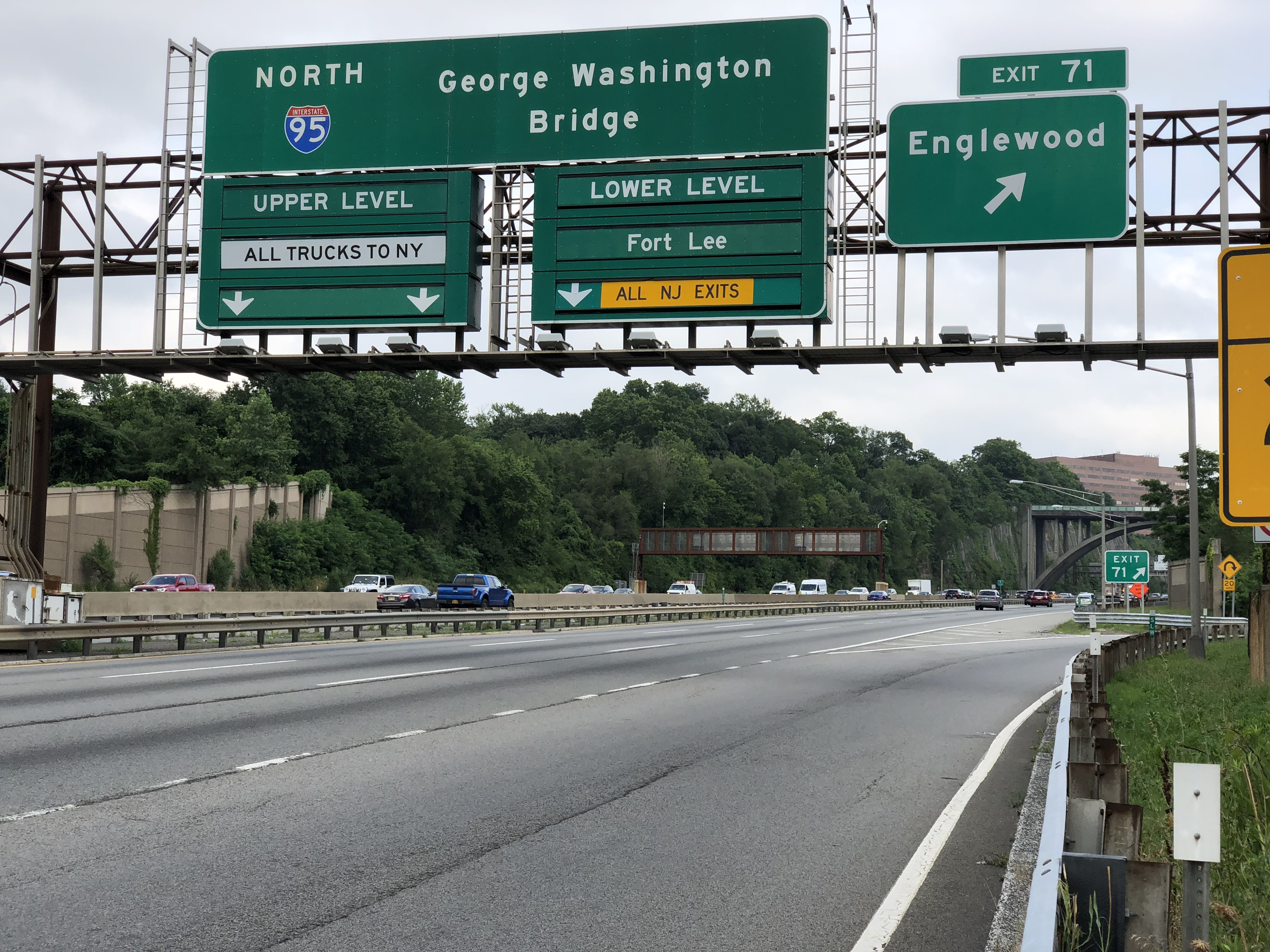
Interstate 95 northbound at the exit for Englewood

As of May 2010, the city had a total of 75.06 miles (120.80 km) of roadways, of which 64.30 miles (103.48 km) were maintained by the municipality, 8.39 miles (13.50 km) by Bergen County, 1.94 miles (3.12 km) by the New Jersey Department of Transportation, and 0.43 miles (0.69 km) by the New Jersey Turnpike Authority.

Interstate 95 is the most prominent highway serving Englewood. It travels through Englewood for 0.43 miles (0.69 km) near the city's southern border with Leonia. Originally built by the New Jersey Department of Transportation, this section is now owned and operated as part of the New Jersey Turnpike, though it is not tolled.

The city is also served by Route 4, Route 93, County Route 501 and County Route 505. The northern terminus of Route 93 is at the intersection with Route 4 and the road continues north as CR 501.

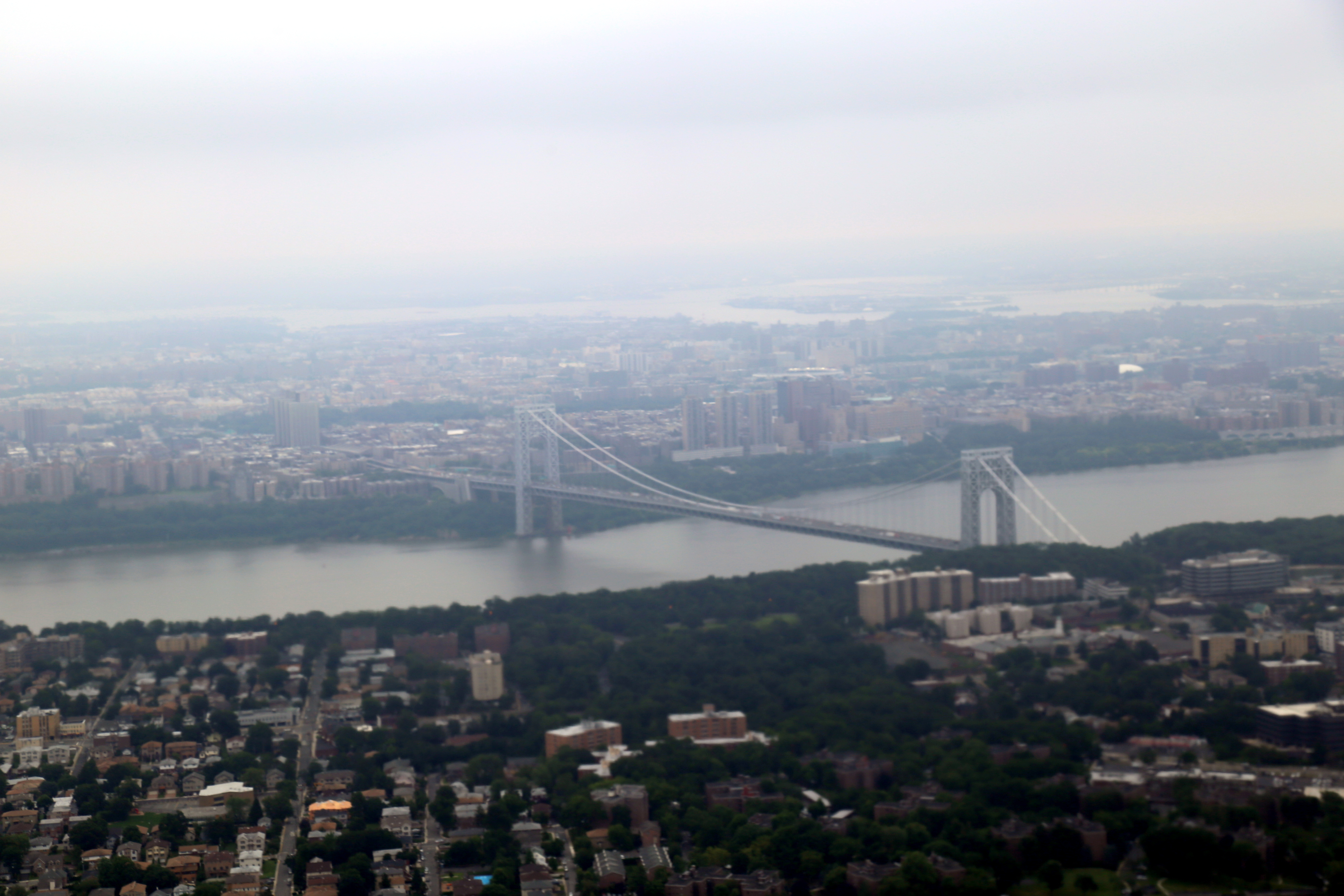
Aerial view of the George Washington Bridge and Manhattan from above Englewood, New Jersey

=== Public transportation ===
Several NJ Transit bus lines serve Englewood. The 166 provides local and express service to and from the Port Authority Bus Terminal in Midtown Manhattan; the 171, 175, 178 and 186 provide service to / from the George Washington Bridge Bus Station in Washington Heights, Manhattan; and the 756 and 780 offer local service. Rockland Coaches provides scheduled service to / from the Port Authority Bus Terminal on Routes 11, 20, and 20T.

Erie Railroad's suburban Northern Branch (NRRNJ) started passenger service in Englewood in 1859, at various stations including the still extant building at Depot Square. It originated/terminated at Pavonia Terminal on the Hudson River in Jersey City and was ended in September 1966 (by which time trains had been redirected to Hoboken Terminal).

The Northern Branch Corridor Project is a proposed NJ Transit (NJT) project to extend the Hudson–Bergen Light Rail along the line providing service to newly built stations along the route. The line would stop at Englewood Route 4 and Englewood Town Center and terminate at Englewood Hospital and Medical Center. A station stop at Depot Square is the city's much-preferred alternative to NJT's proposed new Englewood Town Center Station to the south. Englewood Mayor Frank Huttle III worked with Jersey City Mayor Steven Fulop to advocate on behalf of the project and obtain the needed state and federal funding needed to proceed with the plan, with Huttle emphasizing the economic benefits from the project and that the city wanted to host the terminus, which would include a parking garage near Englewood Hospital and additional parking near Palisade Avenue in the commercial center of the city.

== Religion ==
Congregation Ahavath Torah is a Modern Orthodox synagogue in the city that was founded in 1895 and acquired its current site in 1958.

St. Paul's Episcopal Church is an Episcopal church in the city.

== See also ==
- Palisades Mountain House
