= List of New Jersey railroads =

The following railroads operate in the U.S. state of New Jersey.

== Common Freight Carriers ==
Name	Mark	Class	Notes
Belvidere and Delaware River Railway	BDRV	Class 3	
Black River and Western Railroad	BRW	Class 3	
Cape May Seashore Lines	CMSL	Class 3	
Canadian Pacific Railway	CP	Class 1	Canadian Pacific has trackage rights to Oak Island Yard in Newark, New Jersey.
Conrail Shared Assets Operations	CRCX	Class 3	Conrail is jointly owned by CSX and Norfolk Southern.
CSX Transportation	CSX	Class 1	
Dover and Delaware River Railroad	DD	Class 3	
Delaware and Raritan River Railroad	DRR	Class 3	
Dover and Rockaway River Railroad	DRRV	Class 3	
East Jersey Railroad and Terminal Company	EJR	Class 3	
Hainesport Transfer Railroad	HTFR	Class 3	
Intermodal RR Transfer	IRRT	Class 3	Kearny, NJ
Jersey Marine Rail	JMR	Class 3	Based in Linden, NJ
Morristown and Erie Railway	ME	Class 3	
New Jersey Rail Carriers	NJRC	Class 3	
New Jersey Seashore Lines	NJSL	Class 3	Owned by Cape May Seashore Lines
New York New Jersey Rail	NYNJ	Class 3	Operates the only remaining car float operation in the Port of New York and New Jersey.
New York, Susquehanna and Western Railway	NYSW	Class 2	
Norfolk Southern Railway	NS	Class 1	
Port Jersey Railroad	PJR	Class 3	
Raritan Central Railway	RCRY	Class 3	Serving Raritan Center
SMS Rail Service	SLRS	Class 3	
Southern Railroad of New Jersey	SRNJ	Class 3	
Winchester and Western Railroad	WW	Class 3	

== Private Freight Carriers ==
- Bayshore Terminal
- FAPS
- New Jersey and Northern Railway
- PBF Energy

== Passenger Carriers ==
- Amtrak (AMTK)
- New Jersey Transit Rail Operations (NJTR)
- Port Authority of New York and New Jersey
  - Port Authority Trans-Hudson (PATH)
  - AirTrain Newark
- Delaware River Port Authority: Port Authority Transit Corporation: PATCO Speedline (DRPA)
- SEPTA: West Trenton Line and Trenton Line (SPAX)

== Military Railways ==
- United States Navy - serving the Naval Weapons Station Earle; junction with Conrail. The rail network starts in the Mainside area in Colts Neck, New Jersey and continues to the Pier Complex west of Leonardo, New Jersey, which extends over 2 miles (3 km) into Sandy Hook Bay.

== Defunct Railroads ==
Name	Mark	System (Note: This is one or more of the Class I railroads that the railroad became part of, if any.)	From	To	Successor	Notes
Alloway and Quinton Railroad		PRSL (PRR)	1891	1896	West Jersey and Seashore Railroad	
Anglesea Railroad		PRSL (PRR)	1882	1888	West Jersey Railroad	
Arlington Railroad		ERIE	1887	1942	Erie Railroad	
Atlantic City Railroad		PRSL (RDG)	1889	1933	Pennsylvania–Reading Seashore Lines	
Atlantic Highlands Railroad		CNJ	1889	1890	Freehold and Atlantic Highlands Railroad	
Atlantic Port Railway			1920			
Baltimore and New York Railway		B&O	1888	1944	Staten Island Rapid Transit Railway	
Baltimore and Ohio Railroad	B&O, BO	B&O	1886	1987	Chesapeake and Ohio Railway	
Barnegat Railroad		PRR	1894	1923	N/A	
Barnegat Railroad			1866		Manchester and Barnegat Bay Railway	
Bay Creek Railway		LV	1894	1898	National Docks Railway	
Bay Shore Connecting Railroad		CNJ/ LV	1904	1976	Consolidated Rail Corporation	
Belvidere Delaware Railroad		PRR	1836	1957	United New Jersey Railroad and Canal Company, a subsidiary of PRR, later PC	
Bergen County Railroad		ERIE	1880	1942	Erie Railroad	
Bergen and Dundee Railroad		ERIE	1885	1942	Erie Railroad	
Bergen Neck Railway		LV	1885	1891	National Docks Railway	
Blairstown Railway		NYSW	1876	1883	New York, Susquehanna and Western Railroad	
Bloomfield and Orange Horse Car Railway		ERIE	1868	1870	Watchung Railway	
Bound Brook and Easton Railroad		LV	1872	1872	Easton and Amboy Railroad	
Bridgeton and Port Norris Railroad		CNJ	1866	1878	Cumberland and Maurice River Railroad	
Brigantine Beach Railroad			1889	1896	Philadelphia and Brigantine Railroad	
Buena Vista Railroad		CNJ	1889	1917	Central Railroad of New Jersey	
Burlington County Railroad		PRR	1863	1866	Camden and Burlington County Railroad	
Burlington and Mount Holly Railroad and Transportation Company		PRR	1848	1863	Burlington County Railroad	
Caldwell Railway		ERIE	1890	1892	New York and Greenwood Lake Railway	
Camden and Amboy Railroad and Transportation Company		PRR	1830	1872	United New Jersey Railroad and Canal Company	
Camden and Atlantic Railroad		PRSL (PRR)	1852	1896	West Jersey and Seashore Railroad	
Camden and Burlington County Railroad		PRR	1866	1915	Camden and Burlington County Railway	
Camden and Burlington County Railway		PRR	1915	1958	Penndel Company	
Camden County Railroad		PRSL (RDG)	1889	1901	Atlantic City Railroad	
Camden, Gloucester and Mount Ephraim Railway		PRSL (RDG)	1873	1889	Atlantic City Railroad	
Camden, Moorestown, Hainesport and Mount Holly Horse Car Railroad		PRR	1859	1866	Camden and Burlington County Railroad	
Camden and Woodbury Railroad and Transportation Company		PRSL (PRR)	1836	1840	West Jersey Railroad	
Cape May Railroad		PRSL (RDG)	1894	1894	South Jersey Railroad	
Cape May and Millville Railroad		PRSL (PRR)	1863	1879	West Jersey Railroad	
Carteret Extension Railroad		CNJ	1889	1917	Central Railroad of New Jersey	
Carteret and Sewaren Railroad		CNJ	1890	1917	Central Railroad of New Jersey	
Central Railroad of New Jersey	CNJ	CNJ	1849	1976	Consolidated Rail Corporation	
Charlottesburgh and Green Lake Railroad		CNJ	1876	1888	Morris County Railroad	
Chelsea Branch Railroad		PRSL (PRR)	1889	1896	West Jersey and Seashore Railroad	
Chesapeake and Ohio Railway	CO		1987	1987	CSX Transportation	
Chester Railroad		DL&W	1867	1945	Delaware, Lackawanna and Western Railroad	
Columbus and Kinkora Railroad		PRR	1866	1870	Columbus, Kinkora and Springfield Railroad	
Columbus, Kinkora and Springfield Railroad		PRR	1870	1901	Kinkora and New Lisbon Railroad	
Consolidated Rail Corporation	CR		1976	1999	CSX Transportation, Norfolk Southern Railway	
Constable's Hook Railroad		CNJ	1882	1887	Central Railroad of New Jersey	
Cumberland and Maurice River Railroad		CNJ	1875	1917	Central Railroad of New Jersey	
Cumberland and Maurice River Extension Railroad		CNJ	1887	1917	Central Railroad of New Jersey	
Delaware and Bound Brook Railroad		RDG	1874	1976	Consolidated Rail Corporation	
Delaware, Lackawanna and Western Railroad	DL&W	DL&W	1856	1960	Erie–Lackawanna Railroad	
Delaware River Railroad		PRSL (PRR)	1879	1900	West Jersey and Seashore Railroad	
Delaware River Railroad and Bridge Company		PRR	1896	1954	Penndel Company	
Delaware Shore Railroad		PRSL (PRR)	1873	1879	Delaware River Railroad	
Docks Connecting Railway		ERIE	1886	1942	Erie Railroad	
Dover and Rockaway Railroad		CNJ	1880	1976	Consolidated Rail Corporation	
Durham Transport, Inc.	DRHY		1994	2001	Raritan Central Railway	
East Trenton Railroad		RDG	1884	1955	Delaware and Bound Brook Railroad	
Easton and Amboy Railroad		LV	1872	1903	Lehigh Valley Railroad of New Jersey	
Edgewater Railway		LV	1889	1891	Lehigh Valley Terminal Railway	
Edgewater and Fort Lee Railroad		NYSW	1901	1907	Erie Terminals Railroad	
Elizabeth Extension Railroad		CNJ	1889	1917	Central Railroad of New Jersey	
Elizabethtown and Somerville Railroad		CNJ	1831	1849	Central Railroad of New Jersey	
Enterprise Railroad		PRR	1884	1896	Belvidere Delaware Railroad	
Erie Railroad	ERIE	ERIE	1895	1960	Erie–Lackawanna Railroad	
Erie Railway		ERIE	1861	1878	New York, Lake Erie and Western Railroad	
Erie–Lackawanna Railroad	EL		1960	1968	Erie Lackawanna Railway	
Erie Lackawanna Railway	EL		1968	1976	Consolidated Rail Corporation	
Erie Terminals Railroad		ERIE, NYSW	1907	1942	Erie Railroad	
Farmingdale and Squan Village Railroad		PRR	1867	1879	Freehold and Jamesburg Agricultural Railroad	
Ferro Monte Railroad			1869			
Flemington Railroad and Transportation Company		PRR	1849	1885	Belvidere Delaware Railroad	
Freehold and Atlantic Highlands Railroad		CNJ	1890	1917	Central Railroad of New Jersey	
Freehold and Jamesburg Agricultural Railroad		PRR	1851	1958	Penndel Company	
Freehold and Keyport Railroad		CNJ	1890	1890	Freehold and Atlantic Highlands Railroad	
Freehold and New York Railroad		CNJ	1888	1890	Freehold and Keyport Railroad	
Freehold and New York Railway		CNJ	1877	1888	Freehold and New York Railroad	
Glassboro Railroad		PRSL (RDG)	1883	1889	Atlantic City Railroad	
Green Pond Railroad		CNJ	1874	1876	Charlottesburgh and Green Lake Railroad	
Greenville and Hudson Railway		LV	1895	1903	Lehigh Valley Railroad of New Jersey	
Hackensack Railroad		ERIE	1878	1886	New Jersey and New York Railroad	
Hackensack and Lodi Railroad		NYSW	1896	1953	New York, Susquehanna and Western Railroad	
Hackensack and New York Railroad		ERIE	1856	1873	New Jersey and New York Railway	
Hackensack and New York Extension Railroad		ERIE	1869	1873	New Jersey and New York Railway	
Harrison and East Newark Connecting Railroad		PRR	1898	1954	United New Jersey Railroad and Canal Company	
Hibernia Branch Railroad		CNJ	1888	1905	Wharton and Northern Railroad	
Hibernia Mine Railroad		CNJ	1863	1930	Central Railroad of New Jersey	
Hibernia Underground Railroad			1879			
High Bridge Railroad		CNJ	1872	1887	Central Railroad of New Jersey	
Hoboken Railroad, Warehouse and Steamship Connecting Company			1895	1978	N/A (operated by Hoboken Shore Railroad)	
Hoboken Land and Improvement Company		DL&W, ERIE	1860	1886	Morris and Essex Railroad, New Jersey Junction Railroad	
Hoboken Manufacturers Railroad			1902	1954	Hoboken Shore Railroad	
Hoboken Shore Railroad	HBS		1954	1978	N/A	
Hopatcong Railroad		DL&W	1889	1943	Delaware, Lackawanna and Western Railroad	
Hudson Railroad and Transportation Company			1907			
Hudson Connecting Railway		NYSW	1869	1880	New York, Susquehanna and Western Railroad	
Hudson River Railroad and Terminal Company		NYSW	1892	1893	New York, Susquehanna and Western Railroad	
Irvington Railroad		LV	1904	1906	Lehigh Valley Railroad of New Jersey	
Island Heights Railroad		PRR	1883	1885	Philadelphia and Long Branch Railroad	
Jersey City and Albany Railroad		NYC	1873	1877	Jersey City and Albany Railway	
Jersey City and Albany Railway		NYC	1878	1881	North River Railroad	
Jersey City Belt Line Railway		LV	1890	1913	Lehigh Valley Railroad of New Jersey	
Jersey City, Newark and Western Railway		LV	1889	1891	Lehigh Valley Terminal Railway	
Jersey City Terminal Railway		LV	1888	1891	Lehigh Valley Terminal Railway	
Jersey City and Western Railway		LV	1889	1891	National Docks Railway	
Jersey Southern Railway	JSRW		1984	1987	Winchester and Western Railroad	
Kaighn's Point Terminal Railroad		PRSL (RDG)	1888	1889	Atlantic City Railroad	
Keyport Railroad		CNJ	1888	1890	Freehold and Keyport Railroad	
Kill von Kull Railway		LV	1885	1898	National Docks Railway	
Kinkora and New Lisbon Railroad		PRR	1903	1915	Pennsylvania and Atlantic Railroad	
Lackawanna Railroad of New Jersey		DL&W	1908	1945	Delaware, Lackawanna and Western Railroad	
Lafayette Railroad		CNJ	1889	1917	Central Railroad of New Jersey	
Lake Hopatcong Railroad		CNJ	1882	1887	Central Railroad of New Jersey	
Lehigh Coal and Navigation Company		CNJ	1865	1978	Consolidated Rail Corporation	
Lehigh and Hudson River Railway		L&HR	1881	1882	Lehigh and Hudson River Railway	
Lehigh and Hudson River Railway	L&HR, LHR	L&HR	1882	1976	Consolidated Rail Corporation	
Lehigh and New England Railroad	LNE	LNE	1895	1961	N/A	
Lehigh Valley Railroad	LV	LV	1855	1976	Consolidated Rail Corporation	
Lehigh Valley Railroad of New Jersey		LV	1903	1949	Lehigh Valley Railroad	
Lehigh Valley Terminal Railway		LV	1891	1903	Lehigh Valley Railroad of New Jersey	
Lodi Branch Railroad		NYSW	1870	1953	New York, Susquehanna and Western Railroad	
Long Beach Railroad		PRR	1883	1894	Barnegat Railroad, Philadelphia and Beach Haven Railroad	
Long Branch and Barnegat Bay Railroad		CNJ/ PRR	1880	1881	New York and Long Branch Railroad	
Long Branch and Sea Girt Railroad		CNJ/ PRR	1875	1881	New York and Long Branch Railroad	
Long Branch and Sea Shore Railroad		CNJ	1863	1879	New Jersey Southern Railway	
Long Dock Company		ERIE	1856	1942	Erie Railroad	
Longwood Valley Railroad		CNJ	1867	1887	Central Railroad of New Jersey	
Lucaston Railroad			1892			
Macopin Railroad		ERIE	1886	1926	N/A	
Manahawkin and Long Beach Transportation Company			1893	1909	N/A (leased the Barnegat Railroad)	
Manchester and Barnegat Bay Railway				1869	Tuckerton Railroad	
Manufacturers' Railroad		CNJ	1873	1887	Central Railroad of New Jersey	
Manufacturers' Extension Railroad		CNJ	1889	1917	Central Railroad of New Jersey	
Martins Creek Railroad		PRR	1885	1896	Belvidere Delaware Railroad	
Maurice River Railroad		PRSL (PRR)	1887	1887	West Jersey Railroad	
May's Landing and Egg Harbor City Railroad		PRSL (PRR)	1871	1882	N/A (leased by Camden and Atlantic Railroad)	
Mercer and Somerset Railway		PRR	1870	1879	N/A	
Middle Brook Railroad		CNJ	1899	1917	Central Railroad of New Jersey	
Middle Valley Railroad		CNJ	1897	1917	Central Railroad of New Jersey	
Middlesex Railway		LV	1888	1903	Lehigh Valley Railroad of New Jersey	
Midland Railroad of New Jersey		NYSW	1880	1881	New York, Susquehanna and Western Railroad	
Midland Connecting Railway		NYSW	1881	1881	New York, Susquehanna and Western Railroad	
Midland Terminal and Ferry Company		NYC	1873	1883	West Shore and Ontario Terminal Company	
Millstone and New Brunswick Railroad		PRR	1837	1915	United New Jersey Railroad and Canal Company	
Millville and Glassboro Railroad		PRSL (PRR)	1859	1868	West Jersey Railroad	
Mine Hill Railroad		L&HR	1891	1912	Lehigh and Hudson River Railway	
Monmouth County Agricultural Railroad		CNJ	1867	1877	Freehold and New York Railway	
Monmouth Park Railroad			1878	1889	N/A	
Montclair Railway		ERIE	1867	1875	Montclair and Greenwood Lake Railway	
Montclair and Greenwood Lake Railway		ERIE	1875	1878	New York and Greenwood Lake Railway	
Morris County Railroad		CNJ	1885	1905	Wharton and Northern Railroad	
Morris County Connecting Railroad		CNJ	1901	1905	Wharton and Northern Railroad	
Morris and Essex Railroad		DL&W	1835	1945	Delaware, Lackawanna and Western Railroad	
Morris and Essex Extension Railroad		DL&W	1889	1947	Delaware, Lackawanna and Western Railroad	
Morristown and Erie Railroad	MT&E, ME		1903	1978	Morristown and Erie Railway	
Mount Holly, Lumberton and Medford Railroad		PRR	1866	1915	Camden and Burlington County Railway	
Mount Hope Mineral Railroad	MHM	CNJ	1866	1976	Consolidated Rail Corporation	
National Docks Railway		LV	1879	1905	Lehigh Valley Railroad of New Jersey	
National Docks and New Jersey Junction Connecting Railway		LV	1888	1898	National Docks Railway	
Navesink Railroad		CNJ	1891	1917	Central Railroad of New Jersey	
New Egypt and Farmingdale Railroad		CNJ/ PRR	1869	1881	New York and Long Branch Railroad	
New Jersey Railroad and Transportation Company		PRR	1832	1872	United New Jersey Railroad and Canal Company	
New Jersey, Hudson and Delaware Railroad		NYSW	1832	1870	New Jersey Midland Railway	
New Jersey Junction Railroad		ERIE, NYC	1886	1952	New York Central Railroad	
New Jersey Midland Railway		NYSW	1870	1880	New York, Susquehanna and Western Railroad	
New Jersey and New York Railroad		ERIE	1874	1880	New Jersey and New York Railway	
New Jersey and New York Railway		ERIE	1880	1960	Erie–Lackawanna Railroad	
New Jersey and New York Extension Railroad		ERIE	1886			
New Jersey and Pennsylvania Railroad			1904	1915	Pennsylvania and New Jersey Railroad	
New Jersey Shore Line Railroad		NYC	1886	1914	New Jersey Junction Railroad	
New Jersey Southern Railroad		CNJ	1870	1879	New Jersey Southern Railway	
New Jersey Southern Railway		CNJ	1879	1917	Central Railroad of New Jersey	
New Jersey Terminal Railroad		CNJ	1901	1917	Central Railroad of New Jersey	
New Jersey West Line Railroad		DL&W	1870	1878	Passaic and Delaware Railroad	
New Jersey Western Railroad		NYSW	1867	1870	New Jersey Midland Railway	
New Orange Four Junction Railroad			1901	1905	Rahway Valley Railroad	
New York and Atlantic Highlands Railroad		CNJ	1883	1889	Atlantic Highlands Railroad	
New York Bay Railroad		PRR	1890	1956	United New Jersey Railroad and Canal Company	
New York and Bull's Ferry Railroad		NYC	1861	1862	New York and Fort Lee Railroad	
New York Central Railroad	NYC	NYC	1914	1968	Penn Central Transportation Company	
New York Central and Hudson River Railroad		NYC	1885	1914	New York Central Railroad	
New York Cross Harbor Railroad Terminal Corporation	NYCH		1983	2006	New York New Jersey Rail, LLC	
New York and Erie Railroad		ERIE	1852	1861	Erie Railway	
New York and Fort Lee Railroad		NYC	1862	1952	New York Central Railroad	
New York and Greenwood Lake Railway		ERIE	1878	1943	Erie Railroad	
New York, Lake Erie and Western Railroad		ERIE	1878	1895	Erie Railroad	
New York, Lake Erie and Western Docks and Improvement Company		ERIE	1881	1942	Erie Railroad	
New York and Long Branch Railroad	NYLB	CNJ/ PRR	1868	1976	Consolidated Rail Corporation	
New York and Long Branch Extension Railroad		CNJ/ PRR	1880	1881	New York and Long Branch Railroad	
New York and New Orange Railroad			1897	1900	New Orange Four Junction Railroad	
New York, Ontario and Western Railway	O&W, OW	NH	1883	1957	N/A	
New York, Susquehanna and Western Railroad	S&W, NYSW	NYSW	1881	1980	New York, Susquehanna and Western Railway	
New York, West Shore and Buffalo Railway		NYC	1881	1885	West Shore Railroad	
Newark Railway		LV	1890	1891	Lehigh Valley Terminal Railway	
Newark Bay Railway		LV	1890	1913	Lehigh Valley Railroad of New Jersey	
Newark and Bloomfield Railroad		DL&W	1852	1945	Delaware, Lackawanna and Western Railroad	
Newark and Hudson Railroad		ERIE	1870	1942	Erie Railroad	
Newark and New York Railroad		CNJ	1866	1873	Central Railroad of New Jersey	
Newark and Passaic Railway		LV	1889	1891	Lehigh Valley Terminal Railway	
Newark and Roselle Railway		LV	1889	1891	Lehigh Valley Terminal Railway	
North Jersey Railroad		NYSW	1881	1881	New York, Susquehanna and Western Railroad	
North River Railroad		NYC	1881	1881	New York, West Shore and Buffalo Railway	
Northern Railroad of New Jersey		ERIE	1854	1943	Erie Railroad	
Ocean City Railroad		PRSL (RDG)	1896	1901	Atlantic City Railroad	
Ocean City Railroad		PRSL (PRR)	1884	1885	West Jersey Railroad	
Ogden Mine Railroad		CNJ	1864	1941	N/A	
Passaic and Delaware Railroad		DL&W	1878	1945	Delaware, Lackawanna and Western Railroad	
Passaic and Delaware Extension Railroad		DL&W	1890	1947	Delaware, Lackawanna and Western Railroad	
Passaic and New York Railroad		NYSW	1885	1953	New York, Susquehanna and Western Railroad	
Passaic River Extension Railroad		CNJ	1890	1917	Central Railroad of New Jersey	
Passaic Valley and Peapack Railroad		DL&W	1865	1870	New Jersey West Line Railroad	
Paterson Extension Railroad		NYSW	1881	1881	New York, Susquehanna and Western Railroad	
Paterson and Hudson River Railroad		ERIE	1831	1953	Erie Railroad	
Paterson and Newark Railroad		ERIE	1864	1871	Paterson, Newark and New York Railroad	
Paterson, Newark and New York Railroad		ERIE	1872	1942	Erie Railroad	
Paterson and Ramapo Railroad		ERIE	1841	1946	Erie Railroad	
Pemberton and Hightstown Railroad		PRR	1864	1915	Pennsylvania and Atlantic Railroad	
Pemberton and New York Railroad		PRR	1870	1879	Pemberton and Sea Shore Railroad	
Pemberton and Sea Shore Railroad		PRR	1879	1883	Philadelphia and Long Branch Railroad	
Penhorn Creek Railroad		ERIE	1897	1942	Erie Railroad	
Penn Central Transportation Company	PC		1968	1976	Consolidated Rail Corporation	
Penndel Company		PRR	1954	1976	Consolidated Rail Corporation	
Pennsylvania Railroad	PRR	PRR	1871	1968	Penn Central Transportation Company	
Pennsylvania and Atlantic Railroad	PAUT	PRR	1915	1976	Consolidated Rail Corporation	
Pennsylvania and New England Railroad		LNE	1880	1882	Pennsylvania, Slatington and New England Railroad	
Pennsylvania and New Jersey Railroad			1915	1917	N/A	
Pennsylvania and New Jersey Railroad		PRR	1894	1896	Delaware River Railroad and Bridge Company	
Pennsylvania, New Jersey and New York Railroad		PRR	1902	1907	Pennsylvania Tunnel and Terminal Railroad	
Pennsylvania, Poughkeepsie and Boston Railroad		LNE	1887	1895	Lehigh and New England Railroad	
Pennsylvania–Reading Seashore Lines	PRSL	PRSL	1933	1976	Consolidated Rail Corporation	
Pennsylvania, Slatington and New England Railroad		LNE	1882	1887	Pennsylvania, Poughkeepsie and Boston Railroad	
Pennsylvania Tunnel and Terminal Railroad		PRR	1907	1976	Consolidated Rail Corporation	
Pequest and Wallkill Railroad		L&HR	1866	1881	Lehigh and Hudson River Railway	
Perth Amboy and Bound Brook Railroad		LV	1858	1872	Easton and Amboy Railroad	
Perth Amboy and Elizabethport Railroad		CNJ	1869	1873	Central Railroad of New Jersey	
Perth Amboy and Raritan Railway		LV	1890	1903	Lehigh Valley Railroad of New Jersey	
Perth Amboy and Long Branch Railroad		PRR	1890	1891	Perth Amboy and Woodbridge Railroad	
Perth Amboy and Woodbridge Railroad		PRR	1855	1958	United New Jersey Railroad and Canal Company	
Petersburg and Sea Isle Railroad		PRSL (RDG)	1893	1893	South Jersey Railroad	
Philadelphia and Atlantic City Railroad		PRSL (RDG)	1883	1889	Atlantic City Railroad	
Philadelphia and Atlantic City Railway		PRSL (RDG)	1876	1883	Philadelphia and Atlantic City Railroad	
Philadelphia and Beach Haven Railroad		PRR	1894	1935	N/A	
Philadelphia and Brigantine Railroad			1896	1903	N/A	
Philadelphia and Long Branch Railroad		PRR	1883	1915	Pennsylvania and Atlantic Railroad	
Philadelphia and Long Branch Railway		PRR	1880	1883	Philadelphia and Long Branch Railroad	
Philadelphia, Marlton and Medford Railroad		PRSL (PRR)	1880	1896	West Jersey and Seashore Railroad	
Philadelphia and Reading Railroad		RDG	1879	1896	Philadelphia and Reading Railway	
Philadelphia and Reading Railway	P&R	RDG	1896	1924	Reading Company	
Philadelphia and Sea Shore Railway		PRSL (RDG)	1889	1892	Petersburg and Sea Isle Railroad, Richland and Petersburg Railroad, Winslow and Richland Railroad	
Philadelphia and Trenton Railroad		PRR	1837	1871	Pennsylvania Railroad	
Pittstown Branch Railway		LV	1890	1903	Lehigh Valley Railroad of New Jersey	
Pleasantville and Ocean City Railroad		PRSL (PRR)	1880	1892	West Jersey and Atlantic Railroad	
Pochuck Railroad		LNE	1897	1926	N/A	
Pohatcong Railroad			1907			
Port Oram Railroad		CNJ	1886	1905	Wharton and Northern Railroad	
Port Reading Railroad		RDG	1890	1976	Consolidated Rail Corporation	
Rahway Valley Company	RV		1909	1992	N/A (operated the Rahway Valley Railroad)	
Rahway Valley Railroad			1904	1992	N/A	
Raritan and Delaware Bay Railroad		CNJ	1854	1870	New Jersey Southern Railroad	
Raritan North Shore Railroad		CNJ	1890	1917	Central Railroad of New Jersey	
Raritan River Railroad	RR	CNJ/ PRR	1888	1980	Consolidated Rail Corporation	
Raritan Terminal and Transportation Company		LV	1898			
Reading Company	RDG	RDG	1924	1976	Consolidated Rail Corporation	
Richland and Petersburg Railroad		PRSL (RDG)	1892	1893	South Jersey Railroad	
Ridgefield Park Railroad		NYC	1867	1873	Jersey City and Albany Railroad	
Rockaway River and Montville Railroad		DL&W	1873	1917	N/A	
Rockaway Valley Railroad			1888	1895	Rockaway Valley Railway	
Rockaway Valley Railway			1895	1904	New Jersey and Pennsylvania Railroad	
Rockaway Valley Extension Railroad			1889	1890	Rockaway Valley Railroad	
Rockaway Valley Manufacturing and Construction Company			1890	1895	Rockaway Valley Railway	
Rockaway Valley Mendham Extension Railroad			1890	1895	Rockaway Valley Railway	
Rockaway Valley Morristown Extension Railroad			1892	1895	Rockaway Valley Railway	
Rockaway Valley Peapack Extension Railroad			1889	1890	Rockaway Valley Railroad	
Rocky Hill Railroad and Transportation Company		PRR	1853	1958	United New Jersey Railroad and Canal Company	
Roseland Railway		ERIE	1891	1897	New York and Greenwood Lake Railway	
Roselle and South Plainfield Railway		LV	1885	1891	Lehigh Valley Terminal Railway	
Salem Railroad		PRSL (PRR)	1856	1887	West Jersey Railroad	
Salem Branch Railroad		PRSL (PRR)	1886	1887	West Jersey Railroad	
Seacoast Railroad		PRSL (RDG)	1898	1901	Atlantic City Railroad	
Shore Fast Line, Inc.	SFLR		1983	1991	Southern Railroad of New Jersey	
Somerville and Easton Railroad		CNJ	1847	1849	Central Railroad of New Jersey	
Sound Shore Railroad		CNJ	1894	1917	Central Railroad of New Jersey	
South Branch Railroad		CNJ	1861	1888	Central Railroad of New Jersey	
South Easton and Phillipsburg Railroad		L&HR	1889	1912	Lehigh and Hudson River Railway	
South Jersey Railroad		PRSL (RDG)	1893	1898	Seacoast Railroad	
South Mountain and Boston Railroad		LNE	1873	1880	Pennsylvania and New England Railroad	
Southern New Jersey Railroad			1937	1940	N/A	
Speedwell Lake Railroad				1904	New Jersey and Pennsylvania Railroad	
Squankum and Freehold Marl Company		PRR	1868	1879	Freehold and Jamesburg Agricultural Railroad	
Staten Island Railroad	SIRC	B&O	1971	1991	N/A	
Staten Island Rapid Transit Railroad		B&O	1880	1899	Staten Island Rapid Transit Railway	
Staten Island Rapid Transit Railway	SIR	B&O	1899	1971	Staten Island Railroad	
Stone Harbor Railroad		PRSL (RDG)	1912	1936	Pennsylvania–Reading Seashore Lines	
Stone Harbor Terminal Railroad			1912	1921	Stone Harbor Railroad	
Sussex Railroad		DL&W	1853	1945	Delaware, Lackawanna and Western Railroad	
Sussex Mine Railroad		DL&W	1848	1853	Sussex Railroad	
Sussex Valley Railroad		NYSW	1867	1870	New Jersey Midland Railway	
Swedesboro Railroad		PRSL (PRR)	1866	1887	West Jersey Railroad	
Toms River Railroad		CNJ	1881	1917	Central Railroad of New Jersey	
Toms River and Barnegat Railroad		CNJ	1893	1917	Central Railroad of New Jersey	
Toms River and Waretown Railroad		CNJ	1870	1873	Toms River and Barnegat Railroad	
Trenton Delaware Bridge Company		PRR	1835	1903	N/A	
Trenton–Princeton Traction Company	TPT	RDG	1922	1976	Consolidated Rail Corporation	Electric until 1940
Tuckahoe and Cape May Railway		PRSL (RDG)	1890	1894	Cape May Railroad	
Tuckerton Railroad			1869	1936	Southern New Jersey Railroad	
Union Transportation Company	UTR		1888	1976	Consolidated Rail Corporation	
United New Jersey Railroad and Canal Company		PRR	1872	1976	Consolidated Rail Corporation	
Vincentown Branch of the Burlington County Railroad		PRR	1861	1915	Camden and Burlington County Railway	
Vineland Railroad		CNJ	1877	1917	Central Railroad of New Jersey	
Vineland Railway		CNJ	1867	1873	Vineland Railroad	
Vineland Branch Railroad		CNJ	1909	1917	Central Railroad of New Jersey	
Warren Railroad		DL&W	1851	1945	Delaware, Lackawanna and Western Railroad	
Warwick Valley Railroad		L&HR	1880	1882	Lehigh and Hudson River Railway	
Watchung Railway		ERIE	1870	1893	New York and Greenwood Lake Railway	
Waverly and New York Bay Railroad		PRR	1889	1890	New York Bay Railroad	
Waverly and Passaic Railroad		PRR	1889	1890	New York Bay Railroad	
Wawayanda Railroad		L&HR	1879	1880	Warwick Valley Railroad	
Weehawken Transportation Company		NYC	1871	1873	Midland Terminal and Ferry Company	
West End Railroad		CNJ	1878	1917	Central Railroad of New Jersey	
West Jersey Railroad (Pioneer)	WJ		1988	1995	Southern Railroad of New Jersey	Renamed West Michigan Railroad in 1995. Subsidiary of Pioneer Railcorp.
West Jersey Short Line, Inc.			1985	1988	West Jersey Railroad (Pioneer)	
West Jersey Railroad		PRSL (PRR)	1853	1896	West Jersey and Seashore Railroad	
West Jersey and Atlantic Railroad		PRSL (PRR)	1879	1896	West Jersey and Seashore Railroad	
West Jersey and Seashore Railroad		PRSL (PRR)	1896	1976	Consolidated Rail Corporation	
West Jersey Terminal Railroad		PRSL (PRR)	1887	1887	West Jersey Railroad	
West Shore Railroad		NYC	1885	1952	New York Central Railroad	
West Shore and Ontario Terminal Company		NYC	1883	1901	West Shore Railroad	
West Side Connecting Railroad		CNJ	1889	1917	Central Railroad of New Jersey	
Wharton and Northern Railroad	W&NO, WHN	CNJ	1905	1976	Consolidated Rail Corporation	
Whippany and Passaic River Railroad			1902	1903	Morristown and Erie Railroad	
Whippany River Railroad			1895	1903	Morristown and Erie Railroad	
Wildwood and Delaware Bay Short Line Railroad	W&DB	PRSL (RDG)	1910	1935	Pennsylvania–Reading Seashore Lines	
Williamstown Railroad		PRSL (RDG)	1861	1883	Williamstown and Delaware River Railroad	
Williamstown and Delaware River Railroad		PRSL (RDG)	1883	1889	Atlantic City Railroad	
Winslow and Richland Railroad		PRSL (RDG)	1892	1893	South Jersey Railroad	
Woodstown and Swedesboro Railroad		PRSL (PRR)	1871	1887	West Jersey Railroad	

Private carriers

- Langdon Mine
- Lehigh and Oxford Mining Company

== See also ==
- List of New Jersey railroad junctions
- List of New Jersey street railroads
