= Salem Branch =

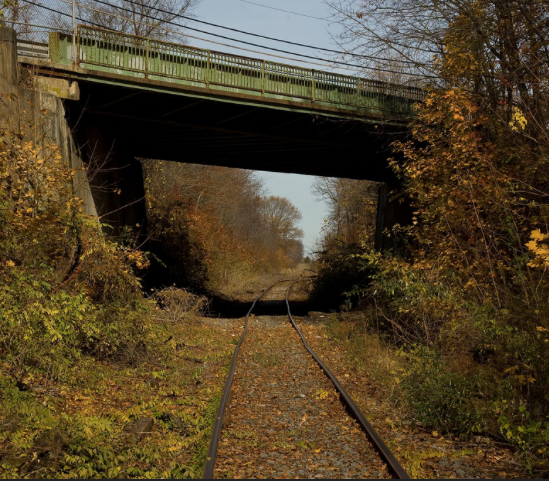
- A bridge over the Salem Branch as seen in June 2014.

Overview
- Locale: Southwest New Jersey, United States
- Termini: Port of Salem; Woodbury Junction

Technical
- Line length: 30.1 mi (48.4 km)
- Track gauge: 4 ft 8 1/2 in (1,435 mm) standard gauge

The Salem Branch is a rail freight line in the southwestern part of New Jersey in the United States between the Port of Salem and Woodbury Junction where it and the Penns Grove Secondary converge with the Vineland Secondary, approximately 8.5 miles (13.7 km) south of Pavonia Yard in Camden.

Ownership of the line changes at Swedesboro. The 11.5-mile (18.5 km) northern section is part of Conrail's Delaware Valley South Jersey/Philadelphia Shared Assets Operations and known as the Salem Running Track; it is leased to the Southern Railroad of New Jersey (reporting mark SRNJ). The 18.6-mile (29.9 km) southern portion is owned by Salem County and operated under contract by SMS Rail Lines (reporting mark SLRS).

== Route ==
The Salem Branch is located within Gloucester and Salem counties. The line begins in Woodbury at a junction with the Penns Grove and Vineland secondaries. It passes through West Deptford, Clarksboro/East Greenwich, Woolwich, Swedesboro, Pilesgrove, Woodstown, and Mannington. After crossing Fenwick Creek at Salem, a spur continues to the Port of Salem. The line also bridges Oldman's Creek and Raccoon Creek.

== History ==
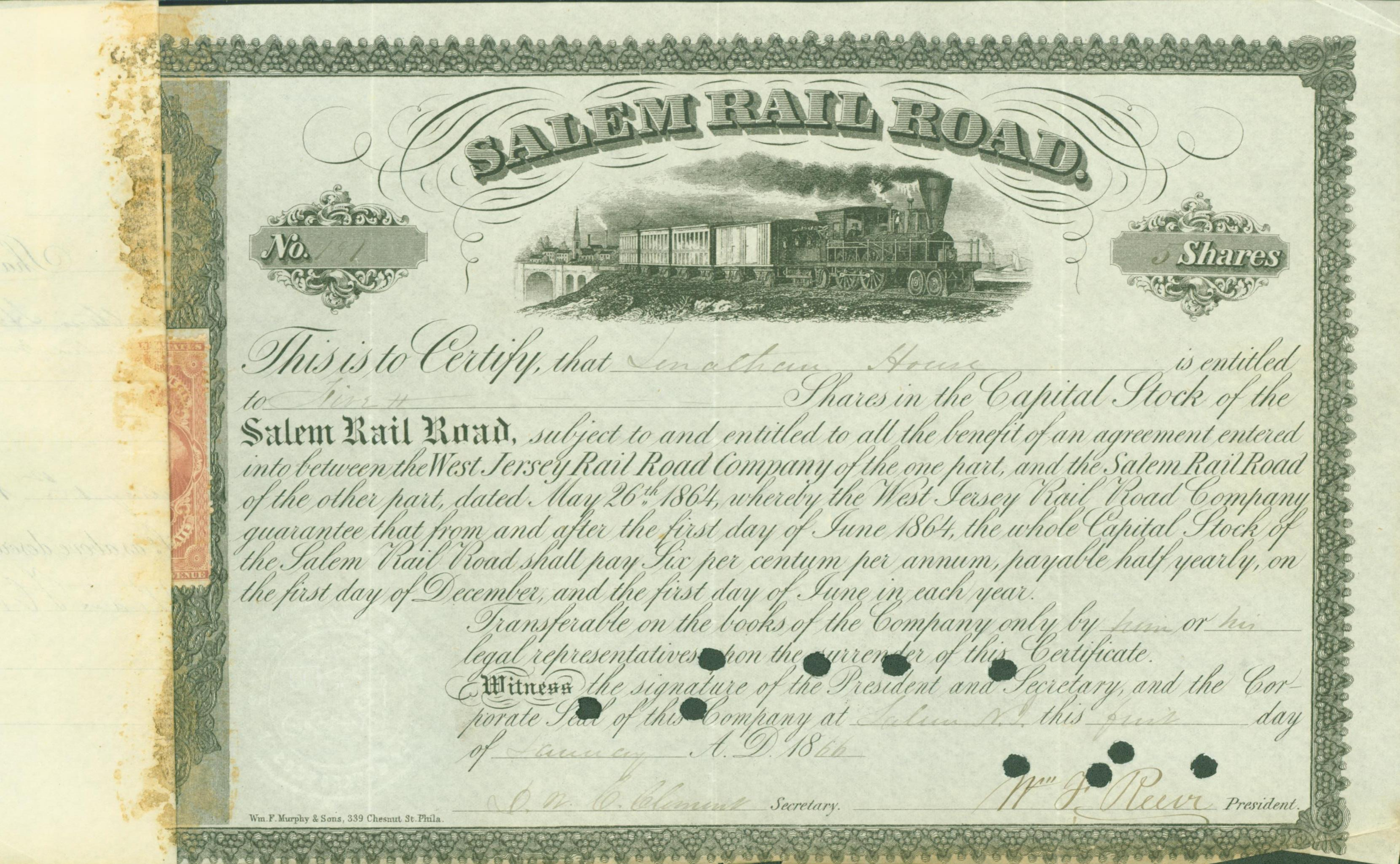
Share of the Salem Rail Road, issued 1 January 1866

The Salem Branch was built at different times by different companies affiliated with the West Jersey Railroad. The oldest section was built by the Salem Railroad, which was incorporated on March 14, 1856. Construction was completed in 1863, stretching from Elmer to Salem, and leased to the West Jersey Railroad on January 1, 1868. The Swedesboro Railroad was incorporated in 1866 and built a line from Woodbury to Swedesboro, a distance of 10.8 miles (17.4 km). This line opened in October 1869. In 1883, the Woodstown and Swedesboro Railroad built a line from the end of the Swedesboro Railroad to Riddleton Junction on the Salem Railroad, east of Salem. Through the Salem Branch Railroad (1886–1887), the West Jersey constructed an additional 1 mile (1.6 km) of main line track in the vicinity of Salem.

On May 4, 1896, the Pennsylvania Railroad (PRR) consolidated its southern New Jersey operations under the West Jersey & Seashore Railroad (WJ&S). In 1931, New Jersey's public utility regulators ordered consolidation of PRR and Reading Railroad (RDG) South Jersey operations. The PRR bought two-thirds of RDG's stock, and the consolidation, Pennsylvania-Reading Seashore Lines (PRSL), became effective June 25, 1933. Passenger service on the Salem Branch ended December 30, 1950. PRSL was acquired by Conrail in 1976, including what had been known as Salem Secondary Track. Following the division of Conrail in 1999, it was designated part of Conrail Shared Assets Operations.

The southern 17.4 miles (28.0 km) of the line and the 1.2-mile (1.9 km) Glass House Spur to the Port of Salem was sold by Conrail to Salem County in 1985, which in 1988 leased the line to Pioneer Railcorp subsidiary West Jersey Rail Company in 1988 to operate. In 1995 operations of the Salem County Branch Line were assumed by SRNJ. In 2009 U.S. Rail Corporation took over operations. In 2012 the county reassigned the contract to SRNJ. In Woodbury, SRNJ maintains a yard and connection with Conrail along with a connection to the Swede Industrial Track. They also maintain a yard in Swedesboro to SMS Rail Lines and the Salem Running Track. In 2018, SRNJ leased the section of the Salem Secondary between Swedesboro and Woodbury from Conrail, with an interchange with Conrail established in Woodbury. Effective June of 2022, SMS Rail Lines has taken over the lease of the line south of Swedesboro.

== Rehabilitation and upgrades ==
Line condition has been rehabilitated due to funding from various county, state, regional, and federal funding appropriations since the county takeover. Much of its infrastructure is antiquated and allows for maximum speeds of 5 miles per hour (8.0 km/h). A 2010 New Jersey Department of Transportation (NJDOT) report anticipated increased port and freight activity in South Jersey. In 2011, the South Jersey Port Corporation, Conrail, and Salem County received $18.5 million in federal money to partially fund rail infrastructure improvements for the 18-mile (29 km) Salem County Branch Line and a new link from the Penns Grove Secondary to Port of Paulsboro, and retrofitting of the Delair Bridge, the most downstream rail crossing of the Delaware River and crucial link between the national rail network and ports at Salem, Paulsboro and Camden. With the federal appropriation and local matching funds, $1.55 million will be used for upgrading trackage from Swedesboro to Salem, expected to be completed by 2015, and $3.5 million to replace the trestle at Oldmans Creek, to be finished by 2014. Train speeds will be improved to 10 to 25 miles per hour (16 to 40 km/h).

Prior to 2013, NJDOT had deemed various project work along the Salem Branch eligible for future state funding. In 2012, the South Jersey Port Corporation (SJPC), Conrail, and Salem County sought another $21 million in federal or NJ state grants in order to complete all needed upgrades for the Salem County Branch Line. NJDOT's 2013 Rail Freight Assistance Program approved 90 percent funding for $2,250,000 for rehabilitation of the Salem Shortline Running Track through Mannington Township, Pilesgrove Township, and Woodstown.

In November 2017, a project to improve rail access at the end of the line in the Port of Salem was begun. Upgrades to the Port continues as of 2022.

== See also ==
- Penns Grove Secondary
- Vineland Secondary
- Class III railroad
- List of New Jersey railroads
