= Ocean City Railroad =

Ocean City Railroad was the name of two different railroad companies:

- Ocean City Railroad (1884), a predecessor of the West Jersey Railroad
- Ocean City Railroad (1896), a predecessor of the Atlantic City Railroad
