= CSAO =

CSAO may refer to:

== Companies ==
Conrail Shared Assets Operations, an American railroad company

== Organisations ==
Club du Sahel et de l’Afrique de l’Ouest, a development organization from the Sahel.
