= Chelsea Branch Railroad (New Jersey) =

American railroad company

Overview
- Locale: New Jersey, USA
- Dates of operation: 1889–1896
- Successor: West Jersey and Seashore Railroad

Technical
- Length: 1.136 mi (1.828 km)

The Chelsea Branch Railroad was a railroad company in the U.S. state of New Jersey. In May 1896, it merged with several other railroads to form the West Jersey and Seashore Railroad, part of the Pennsylvania Railroad system in Atlantic City, New Jersey.

== History ==
The Chelsea Branch Railroad was chartered to build a line from Maine Avenue in Atlantic City to Chelsea. The company's stock was subscribed to in 1889. The line was 1.136 miles (1.828 km) long, and it was operated by the Camden and Atlantic Railroad.

On May 2, 1896, representatives of the Chelsea Branch Railroad met with those of the West Jersey Railroad, the Alloway and Quinton Railroad, the Camden and Atlantic Railroad, and the Philadelphia, Marlton and Medford Railroad to finalize the vote to merge as the West Jersey and Seashore Railroad. The merger became effective on May 4, 1896.
