= Woodstown and Swedesboro Railroad =

Railway company in the United States

Overview
- Parent company: West Jersey Railroad (1883–1887)
- Dates of operation: 1871–1887
- Successor: West Jersey Railroad

Technical
- Track gauge: 1,435 mm (4 ft 8 1/2 in)
- Length: 10.8 miles (17.4 km)

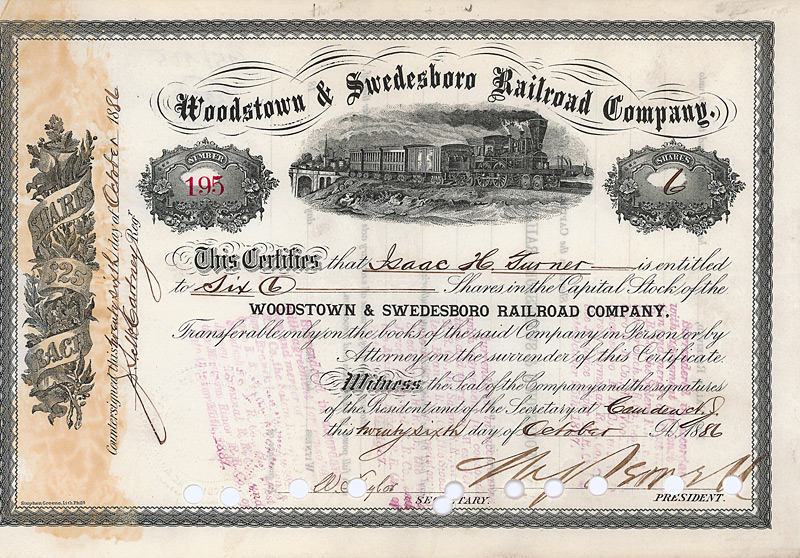

The Woodstown and Swedesboro Railroad was a railway company in the United States. It was incorporated in 1871 to build a line between Woodstown, New Jersey, and Swedesboro, New Jersey. Work eventually went forward in 1882 with the backing of West Jersey Railroad, a forerunner of the Pennsylvania-Reading Seashore Lines, and was completed in 1883. The company was consolidated with the West Jersey Railroad in 1887.

== History ==
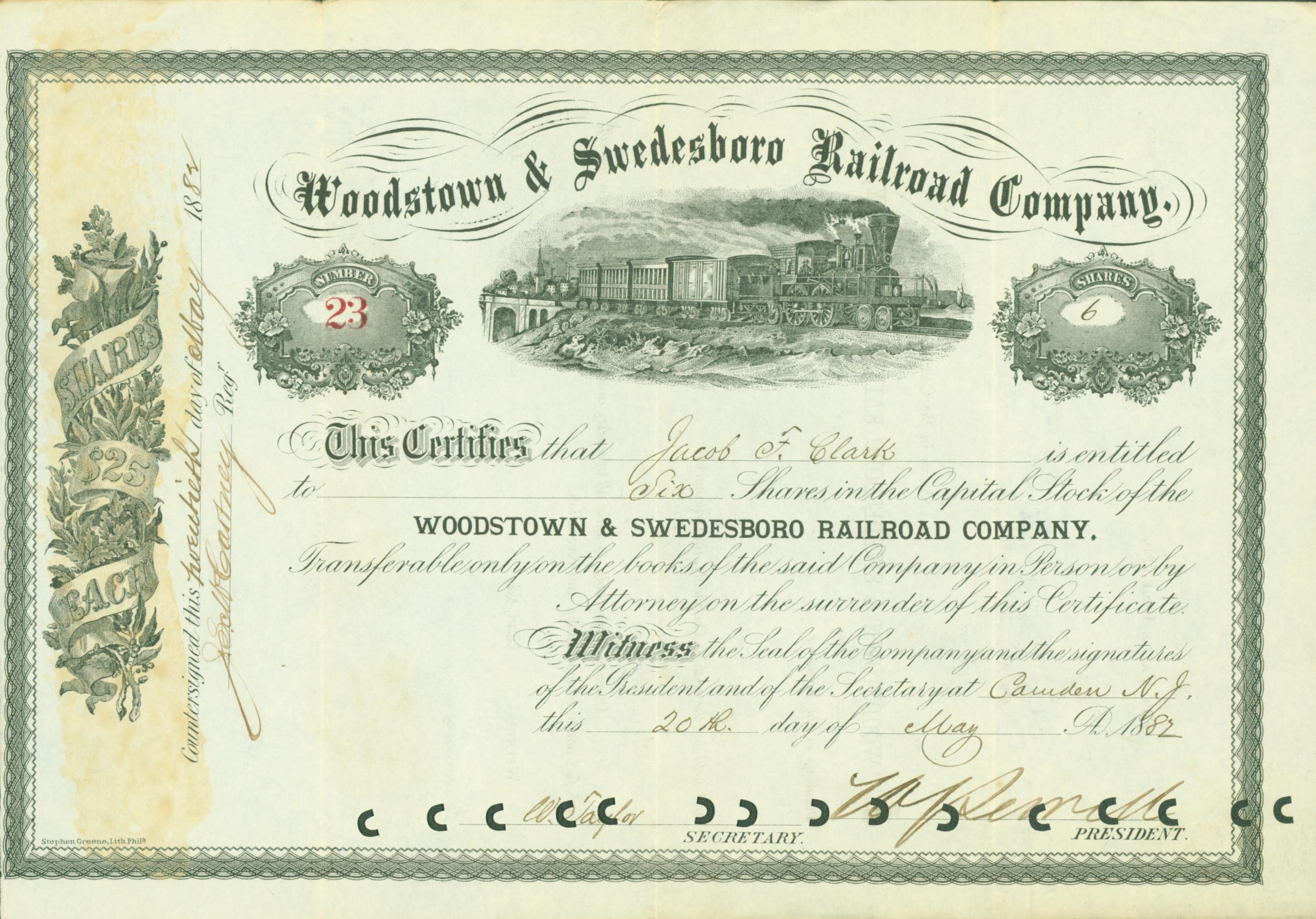
Share of the Woodstown & Swedesboro Railroad Company, issued 20 May 1882

The Woodstown and Swedesboro Railroad was incorporated on March 21, 1871. At the time, Woodstown, New Jersey, lacked direct rail service. The Salem Railroad, completed in 1863, passed several miles to the south. In 1869, the Swedesboro Railroad reached Swedesboro, New Jersey, roughly 7 miles (11 km) to the north. The new company had difficulty raising funds, and no work was done for over a decade.

The company was finally organized on January 21, 1882. The West Jersey Railroad, which had leased the Salem Railroad in 1868 and the Swedesboro Railroad in 1869, took an active interest in the project. The new line opened on February 1883, and the West Jersey Railroad formally leased the Woodstown and Swedesboro Railroad. At the southern end the line connected with the Salem Railroad's line at Riddleston, east of Salem. The new route shortened the distance from Camden to Salem, New Jersey, by 9 miles (14 km).

Under the Pennsylvania-Reading Seashore Lines the line between Woodbury and Salem was known as the Salem Branch. The Woodstown and Swedesboro Railroad, Swedesboro Railroad, Salem Railroad, Maurice River Railroad, Salem Branch Railroad, and West Jersey Terminal Railroad were consolidated with the West Jersey Railroad on December 31, 1887.
