= Delair Branch =

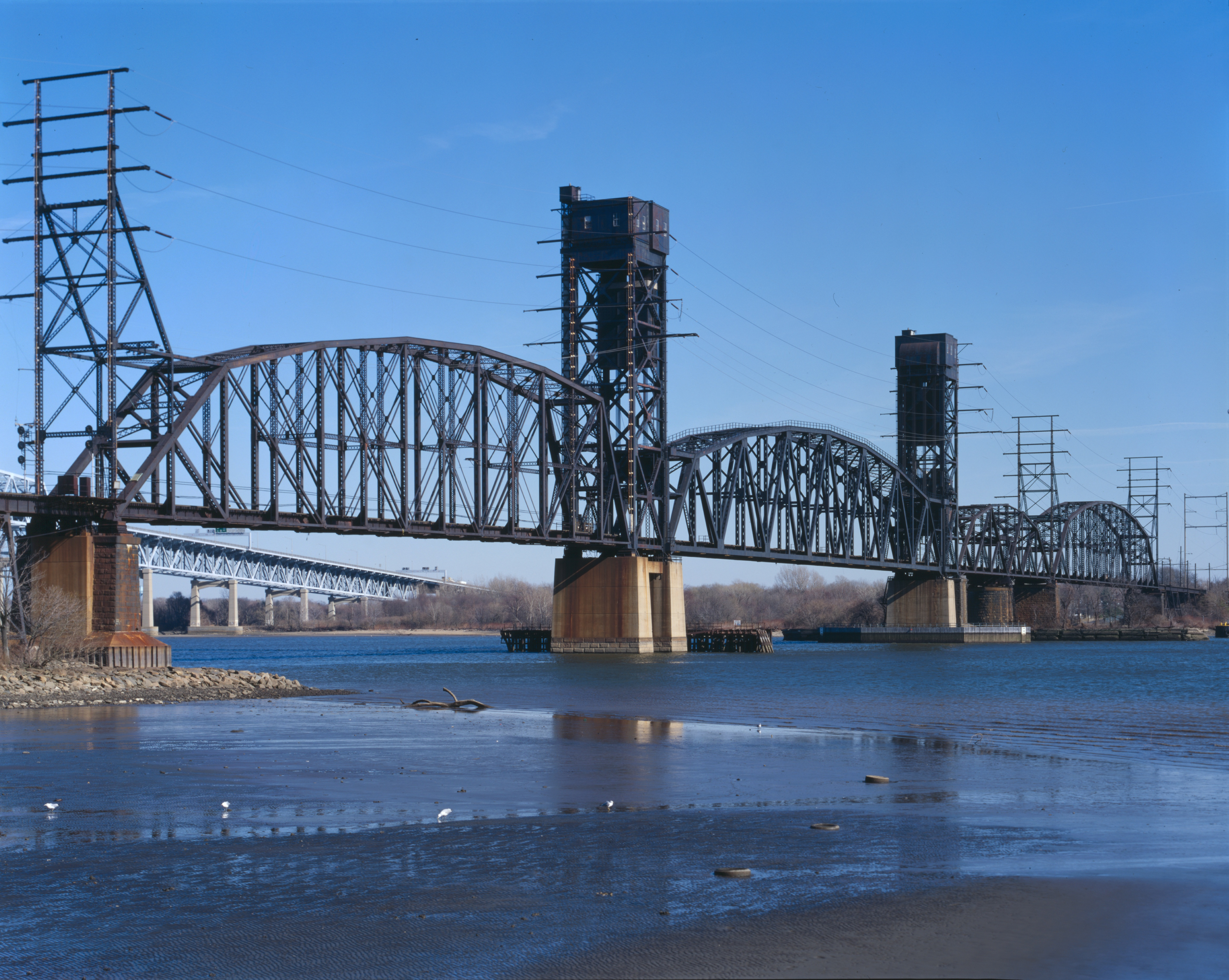
- The Delair Bridge in 1999, viewed from the Pennsylvania side

Overview
- Owner: Amtrak; Conrail Shared Assets Operations

Service
- Operator(s): Conrail Shared Assets Operations

History
- Opened: April 19, 1896

Technical
- Line length: 7.6 mi (12.2 km)
- Track gauge: 1,435 mm (4 ft 8 1/2 in) standard gauge

The Delair Branch is a freight-only railway line in the United States. It runs from Philadelphia to Pennsauken, New Jersey. For most of its length it runs parallel to the Northeast Corridor. It was originally part of the Pennsylvania Railroad system and is now owned by Conrail Shared Assets Operations.

== History ==
The core of the Delair Branch is the Delair Bridge, which crosses the Delaware River between Philadelphia, Pennsylvania, and Pennsauken, New Jersey, northwest of Camden. The bridge was built between 1895 and 1896 by the Delaware River Railroad and Bridge Company, a subsidiary of the Pennsylvania Railroad. The formal opening of the bridge occurred on April 19, 1896.

The west end of the branch connected with the Connecting Railway, another Pennsylvania Railroad subsidiary, at Frankford Junction. That line is now part of the Northeast Corridor through North Philadelphia. On the New Jersey side, the branch was extended east in 1897 to reach the West Jersey and Seashore Railroad at West Haddonfield and the Pemberton Branch at Pennsauken.

The Pennsylvania Railroad merged the Delaware River Railroad and Bridge Company into the Penndel Company, a holding company, on January 1, 1954. Ownership remained there through the Penn Central merger, and the line was conveyed to Conrail in 1976 following the Penn Central bankruptcy. Ownership of the adjacent Northeast Corridor passed to Amtrak.

In 1994, Conrail and Amtrak collaborated to make the southernmost track on the Northeast Corridor between Frankford Junction and the Schuylkill River freight-only. At the western end, Conrail built a new connection to the Trenton Line. Conrail extended the "Delair Branch" westward to cover this new "line." In the 1999 breakup of Conrail, CSX obtained the Trenton Line, while the Delair Branch remained with Conrail Shared Assets Operations. Similar to the arrangement with Amtrak, the Conrail line shared the alignment between Frankford Junction and Pennsauken with NJ Transit's Atlantic City Line.
