= Delaware River Railroad and Bridge Company =

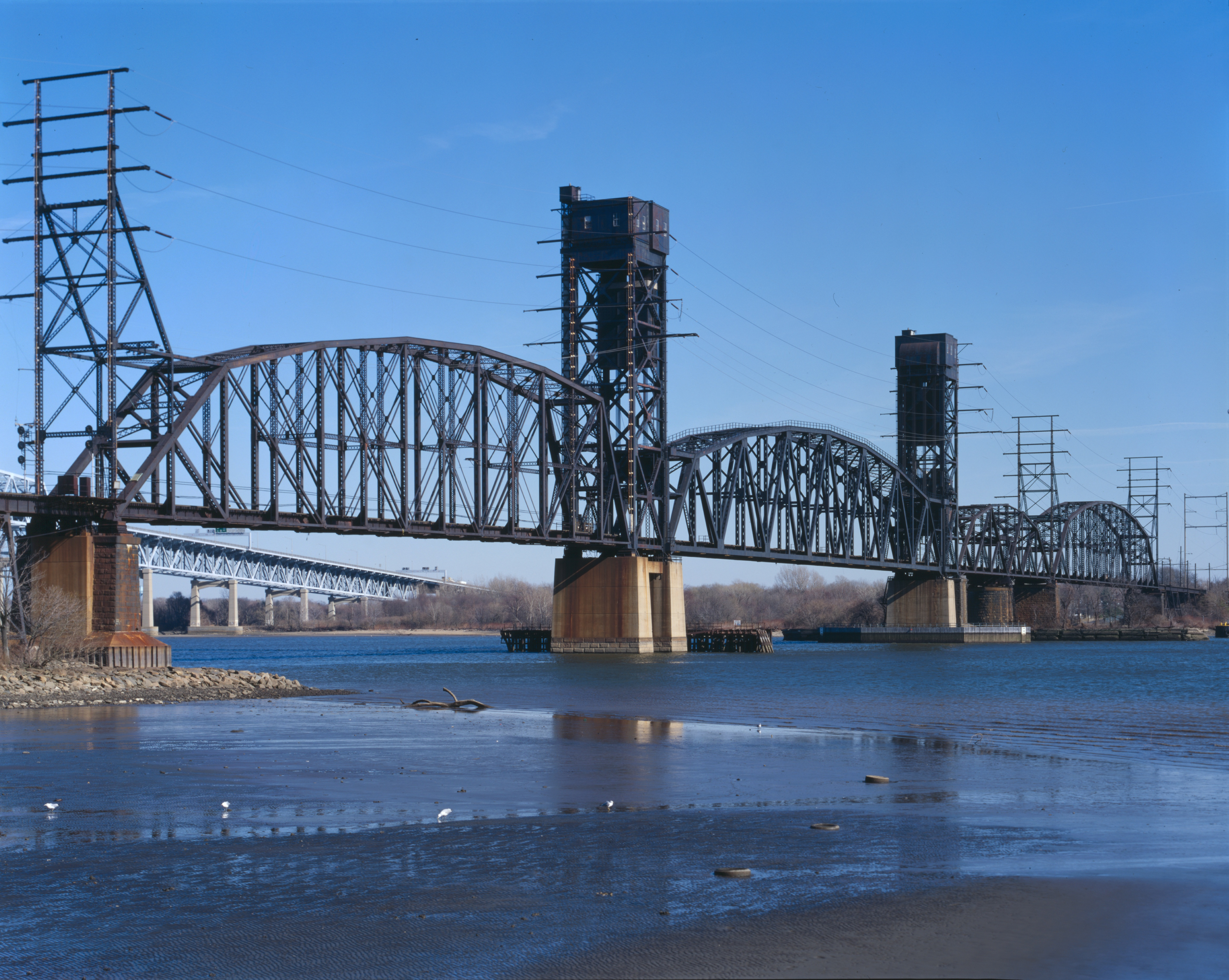
- The Delair Bridge in 1999, viewed from the Pennsylvania side

Overview
- Parent company: Pennsylvania Railroad
- Dates of operation: 1896–1954
- Predecessor: Pennsylvania and New Jersey Railroad (of New Jersey); Pennsylvania and New Jersey Railroad (of Pennsylvania)
- Successor: Penndel Company

Technical
- Length: 9.5 miles (15.3 km)

The Delaware River Railroad and Bridge Company was a railway company in the United States. A subsidiary of the Pennsylvania Railroad, it constructed the Delair Bridge across the Delaware River, connecting Philadelphia with Camden, New Jersey. The company was incorporated in 1896 to consolidate two predecessor companies, one in Pennsylvania and one in New Jersey. The bridge opened the same year, and various connecting branches in 1897. The Pennsylvania merged the company into the Penndel Company in 1954. Its line now belongs to Conrail Shared Assets Operations.

== History ==
Prior to the construction of the Delair Bridge there was no rail crossing of the Delaware River between Philadelphia and Camden, New Jersey. This was inconvenient for the Pennsylvania Railroad, which had substantial operations on both sides of the river. Freight either used car floats or traveled over the Amboy Branch to Trenton, New Jersey, some 30 miles (48 km) to the north. Passengers used ferries to travel between the two cities. Spanning the Delaware closer to Philadelphia would greatly improve the efficiency of freight service and provide a direct route between Philadelphia and destinations in South Jersey, including Atlantic City.

The Pennsylvania Railroad started the process in 1894 by incorporating two companies, both named Pennsylvania and New Jersey Railroad: one in New Jersey and one in Pennsylvania. Construction proceeded on both sides of the Delaware River on the Delair Bridge and the approaches to the new bridge. These companies were consolidated into the Delaware River Railroad and Bridge Company on March 16, 1896, on the completion of the construction work. The formal opening of the bridge occurred on April 19, 1896.

On the Pennsylvania side, the company constructed a connection with the Connecting Railway (now the Northeast Corridor) at Frankford Junction. On the New Jersey side, construction of the approaches was delayed by litigation with property owners. The bridge opened with a connection to the Amboy Branch at Morris, New Jersey. Two additional connections opened on May 29, 1897: a further connection to the Amboy Branch via Fish House, and a connection to the West Jersey and Seashore Railroad main line at West Haddonfield. This latter branch also connected with the Pemberton Branch in Pennsauken, New Jersey. With the creation of the connection at West Haddonfield direct service between Philadelphia and Atlantic City became possible.

The Delaware River Railroad and Bridge Company remained a non-operating lessee of the Pennsylvania Railroad until January 1, 1954, when it was merged into the Penndel Company, a holding company.
