= Swedesboro Railroad =

Overview
- Parent company: West Jersey Railroad (1869–1887)
- Dates of operation: 1866–1887
- Successor: West Jersey Railroad

Technical
- Track gauge: 1,435 mm (4 ft 8 1/2 in)
- Length: 10.8 miles (17.4 km)

The Swedesboro Railroad was a railway company in the United States. It was incorporated in 1866 and completed a line between Woodbury and Swedesboro, New Jersey, in 1869. It was leased by the West Jersey Railroad, a forerunner of the Pennsylvania-Reading Seashore Lines, that same year, and formally merged in 1887.

== History ==
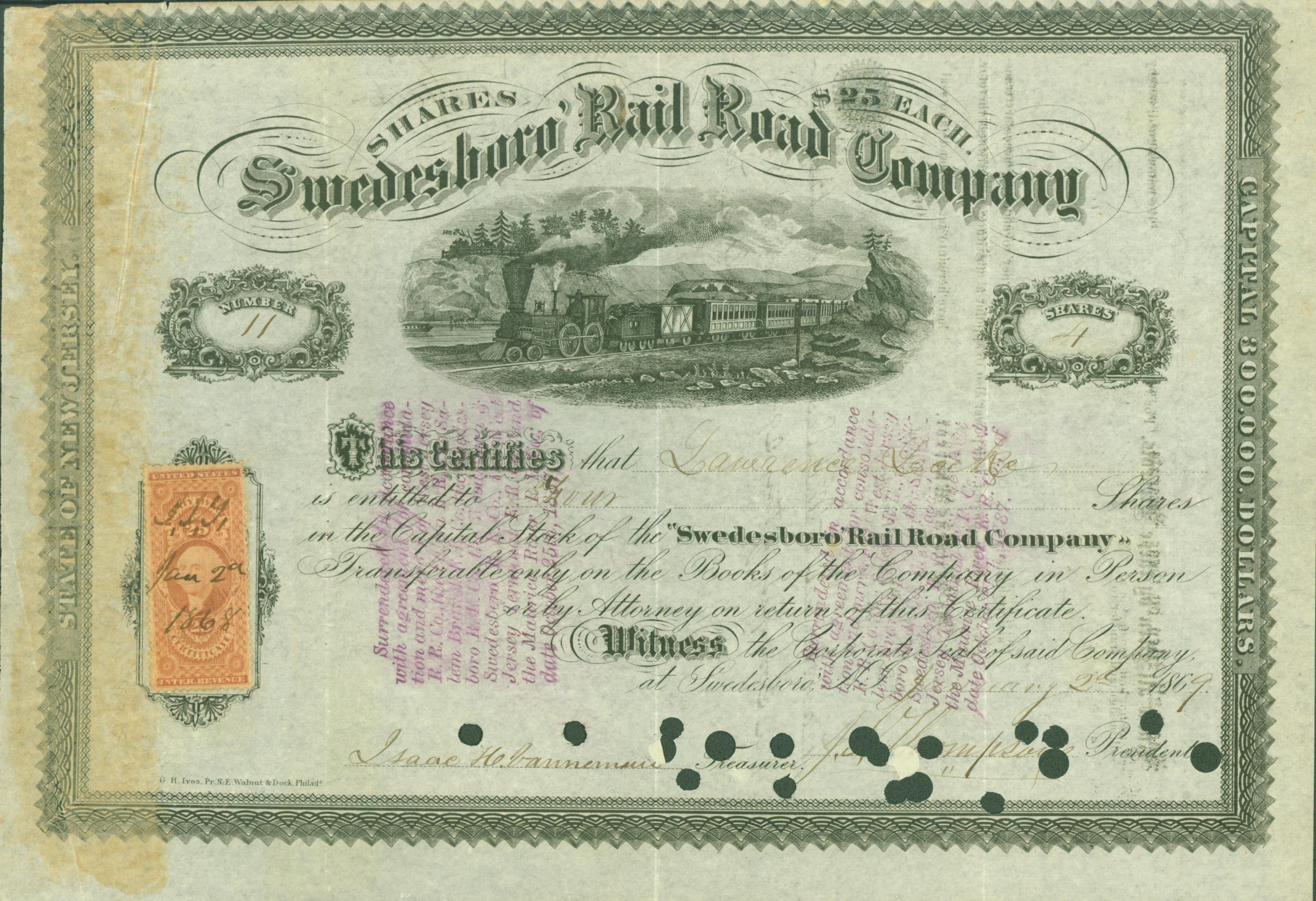
Share of the Swedesboro Rail Road Company, issued 2 January 1869

The first serious attempt to construct a railroad to Swedesboro, New Jersey, was in 1854, when the New Jersey Legislature approved a charter for the Woodbury and Swedesboro Railroad. The principal figure behind the proposed railroad was Joshua S. Thompson, a local lawyer and long-time county prosecutor for Gloucester County, New Jersey. The Camden and Amboy Railroad showed interest, but nothing came of the project.

Thompson led a second, successful effort in the 1860s with the Swedesboro Railroad, which was incorporated on February 23, 1866. (Note: Coverdale & Colpitts misprints Thompson's name as "Thomson.") This new venture had the backing of the West Jersey Railroad, whose main line ran from Camden, New Jersey, to Cape May via Woodbury. The West Jersey leased the Swedesboro Railroad on August 17, 1869, and the company's line opened between Woodbury and Swedesboro on October 2.

Another company, the Woodstown and Swedesboro Railroad, built south from Swedesboro to Woodstown and then on to a junction with the Salem Railroad east of Salem. This extension was completed in February 1883, creating a direct route between Woodbury and Salem. Under the Pennsylvania-Reading Seashore Lines this line was known as the Salem Branch. The Swedesboro Railroad, Woodstown and Swedesboro Railroad, Salem Railroad, Maurice River Railroad, Salem Branch Railroad, and West Jersey Terminal Railroad were consolidated with the West Jersey Railroad on December 31, 1887.
