= Southern Railroad of New Jersey =

American railroad

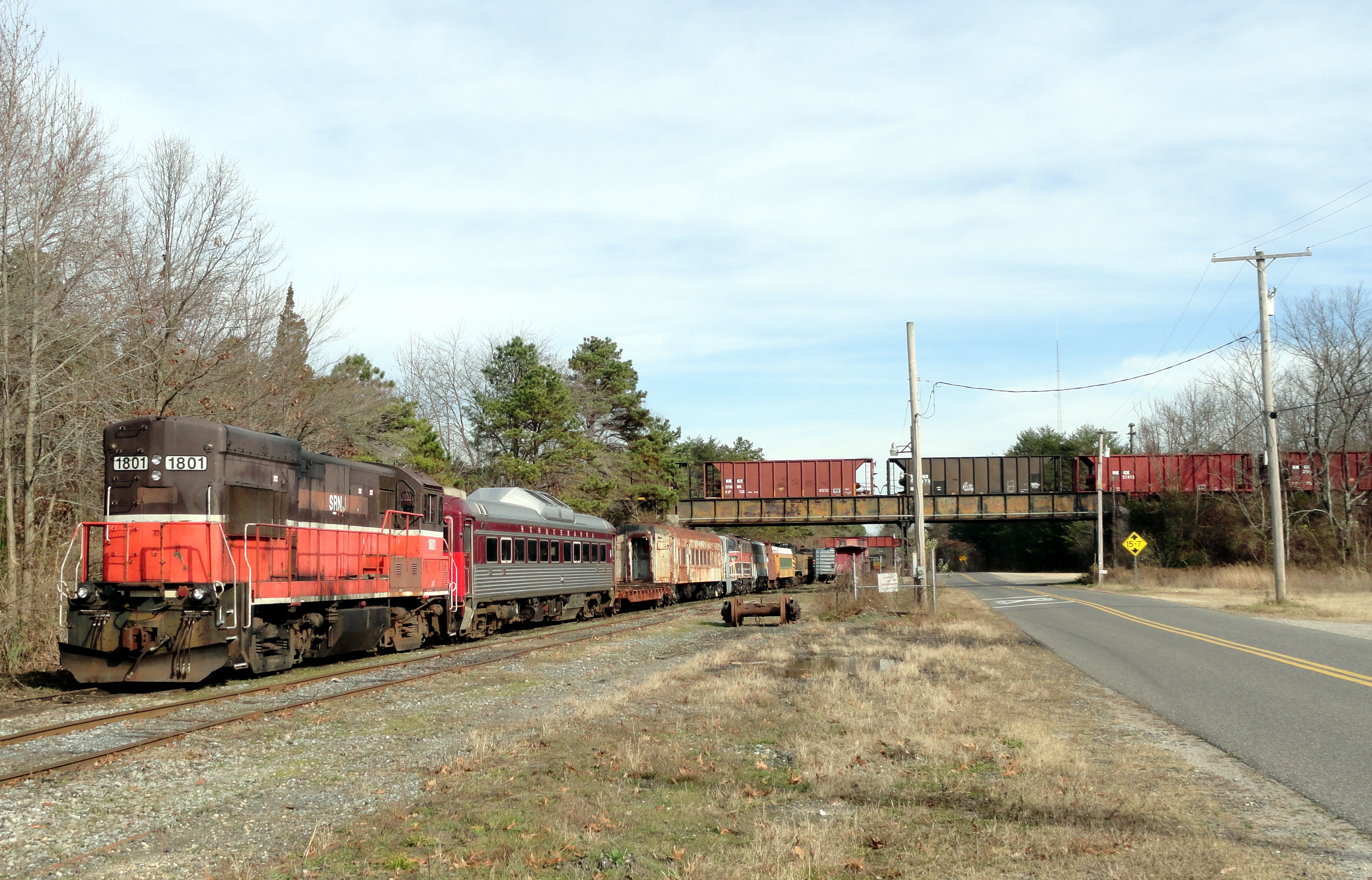
- SRNJ locomotive 1801 at Winslow Junction, New Jersey with the trestle for Beesley Point Secondary line of Conrail Shared Assets Operations in center

Overview
- Headquarters: Winslow Township, New Jersey, U.S.
- Reporting mark: SRNJ
- Locale: South Jersey
- Dates of operation: 1991–present
- Predecessor: Conrail

Technical
- Track gauge: 4 ft 8 1/2 in (1,435 mm) standard gauge
- Length: 71 miles (114 km)

The Southern Railroad of New Jersey (reporting mark SRNJ) is a small short-line railroad company based in Winslow Township, New Jersey. The railroad operates freight service in two areas in Southern New Jersey. In the Winslow area, trains operate out of Winslow Junction to either Pleasantville or the Winslow Hot Mix asphalt plant in Winslow Township. In Gloucester County, the company operates on the Salem Branch between Swedesboro, New Jersey and Woodbury, New Jersey.

== Ownership history ==
JP Rail, Inc., a Pennsylvania corporation doing business as SRNJ, operates tracks in the Winslow area that originally belonged to the New Jersey Southern Railroad, and which were later acquired by the Central Railroad of New Jersey (in the 1880s) and subsequently Conrail (1976) and the New Jersey Department of Transportation (NJDOT; 1984). SRNJ acquired operating rights to the 15.5 miles (24.9 km) Winslow-Vineland route, known as the Winslow Branch, from The Shore Fast Line, Inc. (SFLR) in 1991. (SFLR, a freight carrier, is not to be confused with the Shore Fast Line, an interurban passenger railroad that was operated by the Atlantic City and Shore Railroad from 1907 to 1948.)

In the 1991 transaction SRNJ also obtained rights from SFLR to operate freight on 30.7 miles (49.4 km) of the Atlantic City Line owned by New Jersey Transit, from Winslow to Pleasantville; and took ownership of several short sections of connecting branch lines and junctions.

The Salem-Swedesboro route, known locally as the Salem County Branch Line, was originally part of the Salem Railroad (later the West Jersey and Seashore Railroad), and subsequently became the Salem Secondary Track on the Pennsylvania-Reading Seashore Lines (PRSL). PRSL was acquired by Conrail in 1976, and the Salem branch was sold by Conrail to the Salem County government in 1985. SRNJ contracted with the county in 1995 to take over operations on the 18.6 miles (29.9 km) route (plus a one-mile spur in Salem) from the West Jersey Railroad Co. which was awarded the initial contract by the county in 1988. Between 2009 and 2012 U.S. Rail Corporation operated the Salem line. In 2012 the county reassigned the contract to SRNJ, which ended in 2022.

== Operations ==
=== Winslow Junction operations ===
The railroad serves local businesses and interchanges freight cars with Conrail Shared Assets Operations (CSAO). SRNJ maintains an interchange yard at Winslow Junction, connecting with the Atlantic City Line and CSAO Beesley Point Secondary Track. The Winslow branch route was restored after it was damaged by floods in 2003. As of April 2025 the Winslow Junction-Vineland section of track is not in use south of Winslow Hot Mix. The railroad also has trackage rights over NJT's Atlantic City Line, to Atlantic City, where they can access their branch line to Pleasantville, NJ.

=== Salem Branch operations ===
In 2018, the SRNJ leased the Salem Branch between Swedesboro and Woodbury from Conrail. In Woodbury, the SRNJ maintains a yard and connects with Conrail Shared Assets Operations. The railroad also maintains a yard in Swedesboro for interchange with SMS Rail Lines.

== Roster ==
The SRNJ owns a diverse variety of locomotive equipment including an EMD GP9, EMD GP10 and MLW M-420s. The company is currently leasing a MPI MP20B from New Jersey Transit for Atlantic City Line signal requirements.

== See also ==
- Class III railroad
- List of New Jersey railroads
