= Cape May and Millville Railroad =

Overview
- Parent company: West Jersey Railroad (1868–1879)
- Dates of operation: 1863–1879
- Successor: West Jersey Railroad

Technical
- Track gauge: 1,435 mm (4 ft 8 1/2 in)
- Length: 41.58 miles (66.92 km)

The Cape May and Millville Railroad was a railway company in the United States. It was incorporated in 1863 and began operation between Millville, New Jersey, and Cape May, New Jersey, that same year. The West Jersey Railroad, a forerunner of the Pennsylvania-Reading Seashore Lines, leased the company in 1868 and formally merged with it in 1879.

== History ==
The Cape May and Millville Railroad was incorporated on March 9, 1863. Its backers were mostly businessmen from Cape May County, but also included some directors of the nearby Millville and Glassboro Railroad. The New Jersey legislature had authorized the Millville and Glassboro to extend to Cape May, but the railroad lacked the resources to do so. The Cape May and Millville continued the work begun by the Millville and Glassboro and completed the line between Millville, New Jersey, and Cape May, New Jersey, in August 1863. There was now a continuous line between Camden, New Jersey, and Cape May.

The West Jersey Railroad, which owned a line between Camden and Glassboro, New Jersey, acquired the Millville and Glassboro Railroad on April 1, 1868, and leased the Cape May and Millville Railroad on June 1, 1868. The Cape May and Millville was merged into the West Jersey Railroad on September 25, 1879.

In the rationalization that followed the creation of the Pennsylvania-Reading Seashore Lines in 1933, the former Cape May and Millville line was abandoned between Sea Isle Junction and Cape May in favor of the former Cape May Railroad route. Further abandonments truncated the line to Manumuskin, New Jersey, by 1951. The remainder forms the southern end of the Vineland Secondary.
