= Rockaway River and Montville Railroad =

The Rockaway River and Montville Railroad connected the Lackawanna Railroad's Boonton Branch in Boonton, New Jersey with a stone quarry on Hog Mountain (also known as Turkey Mountain) in Montville, New Jersey. The railroad was incorporated in April 1873 and the capital stock was owned by the Lackawanna. The branch ran northeasterly from the Lackawanna's mainline up a very steep grade. The quarry was located about a mile up from the mainline. Railroaders would tell harrowing stories of bringing heavy freight trains, laden with stone, down the short branch. Bad weather made the downgrade trip particularly treacherous.

The train station in Madison, New Jersey, which is on the National Register of Historic Places, was built with stone quarried on Hog Mountain. The station opened on April 17, 1916, and recently underwent a total restoration. The RV&MRR closed shortly after completion of the Madison train station. Stone from the quarry was also used to build a dam on the Boonton Reservoir (also known as the Jersey City Reservoir) in Boonton, New Jersey.

The RV&MRR was built on a right-of-way that is now occupied by Capstick Road. The quarry appears on local maps at the end of the present road. However, there apparently was at least one more quarry located farther up the mountain along what is now Briarcliff Road. There is a narrow, unnamed road that connects Capstick Road and Briarcliff Road.
