= Delair Bridge =

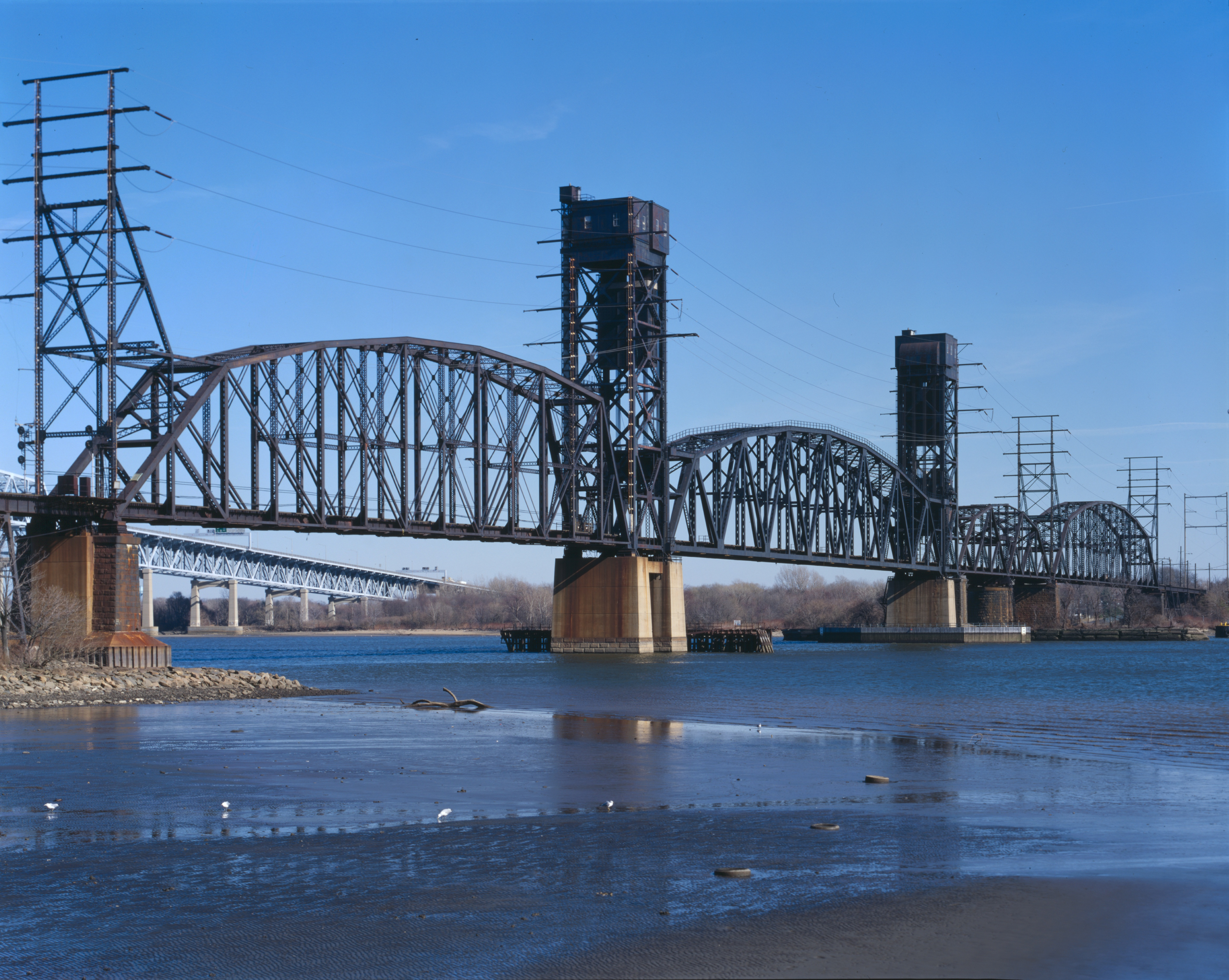
- The Delair Bridge viewed from the Pennsylvania side
- Coordinates: 39°58′57″N 75°04′09″W
- Carries: Trains of New Jersey Transit Atlantic City Line and Conrail Delair Branch
- Crosses: Delaware River
- Locale: Philadelphia, Pennsylvania, and Pennsauken Township, New Jersey

Characteristics
- Design: Steel Lift Bridge
- Total length: 4,396 feet (1,340 m)
- Longest span: 542 feet (165 m)

History
- Opened: April 19, 1896

Location
- Interactive map of Delair Bridge

The Delair Bridge is a railroad bridge with a vertical-lift section that crosses the Delaware River between Philadelphia, Pennsylvania, and Pennsauken Township, New Jersey, just south of the Betsy Ross Bridge. The two-track bridge is part of Conrail Shared Assets Operations and is jointly used by Norfolk Southern Railway and CSX Transportation freight trains, as well as by the New Jersey Transit Atlantic City Line service.

== History ==
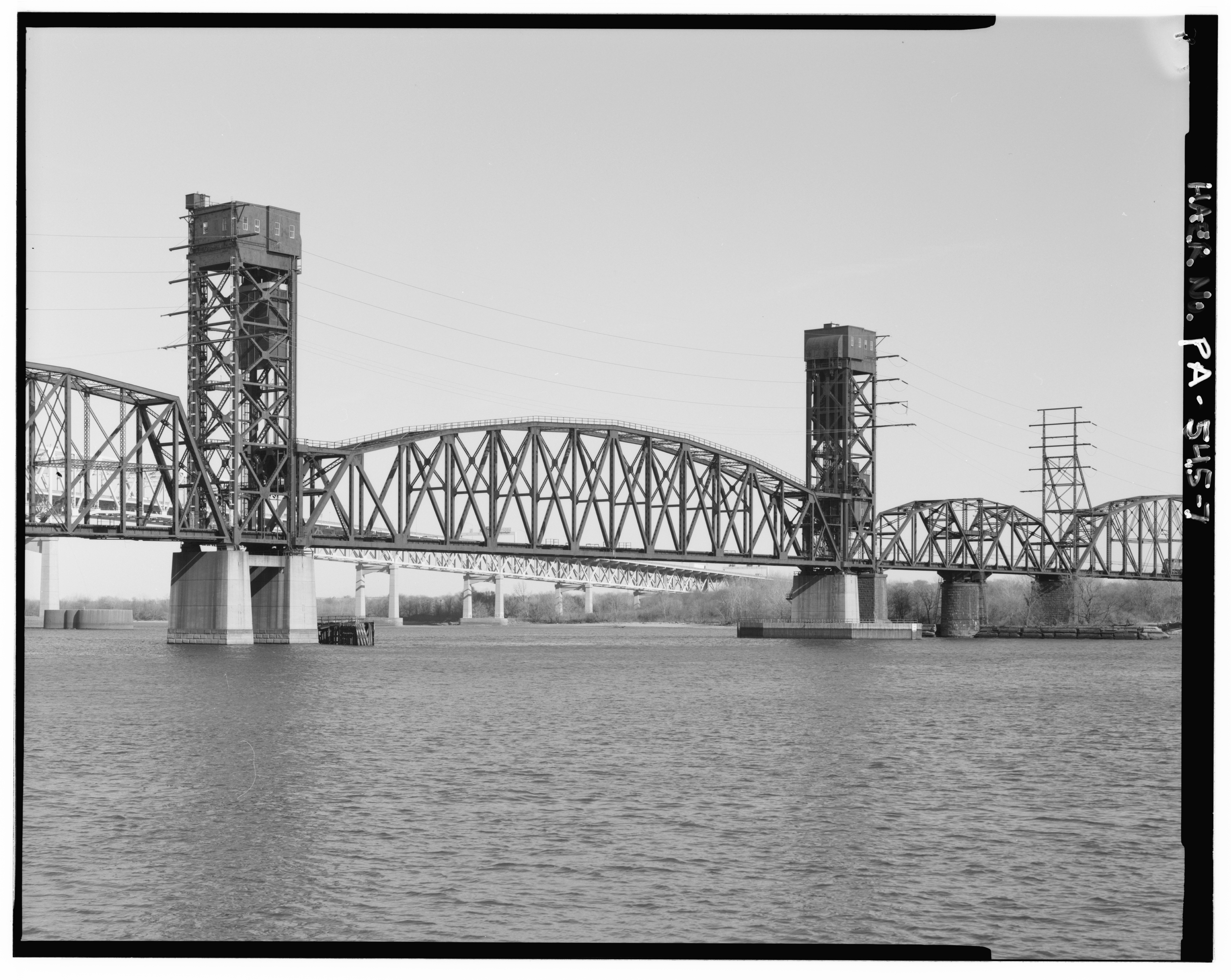
The lift span of the bridge in 1999

The Delair Bridge, built by the Delaware River Railroad and Bridge Company (a subsidiary of the Pennsylvania Railroad (PRR)) in 1895–1896, was the first bridge of any sort between Philadelphia and New Jersey. The steel span connected PRR tracks in North Philadelphia to southern New Jersey. It consisted of three fixed Pennsylvania truss spans and a through-truss swing-span drawbridge totaling 1,943 feet (592 m). Approach trestles of 2,129 feet (649 m) on the Pennsylvania side and 324 feet (99 m) on the New Jersey side bring its total length to 4,396 feet (1,340 m).

Starting in 1958, the PRR converted the bridge into a vertical-lift span to increase clearance for river traffic. The 542 feet (165 m) movable link was floated into place in one piece to facilitate installation and minimize delay. Work was completed in 1960. The Delair Bridge was the longest and heaviest double-track lift bridge in the world at the time. Note that the single-track Cape Cod Canal Railroad Bridge is 2 feet (0.61 m) longer.

The bridge was also electrified in the late 1930s, allowing freight trains hauled by electric locomotives to access the Pavonia Yard in Camden, New Jersey, from the Northeast Corridor. Electrification was removed by January 1967 but was restored in May 1973. However, Conrail ceased electric freight operations in 1981 and removed the wires several years later.

Passenger train traffic on the bridge ceased in 1969 when Pennsylvania-Reading Seashore Lines service was cut to Lindenwold station after the completion of the PATCO Speedline, but was restored in 1989 when Amtrak began the Atlantic City Express service. Amtrak service ended in 1995, but New Jersey Transit Atlantic City Line service has used the bridge continuously since 1993.

The bridge's southern track was formerly reserved for freight traffic, and the northern track only used for the Atlantic City Line. As part of the Pennsauken Transit Center project, a station complex where the River LINE passes under the Delair Bridge's eastern approach, platforms were built on both tracks. Both tracks are now used by both passenger and freight trains.

== 21st century rehabilitation ==
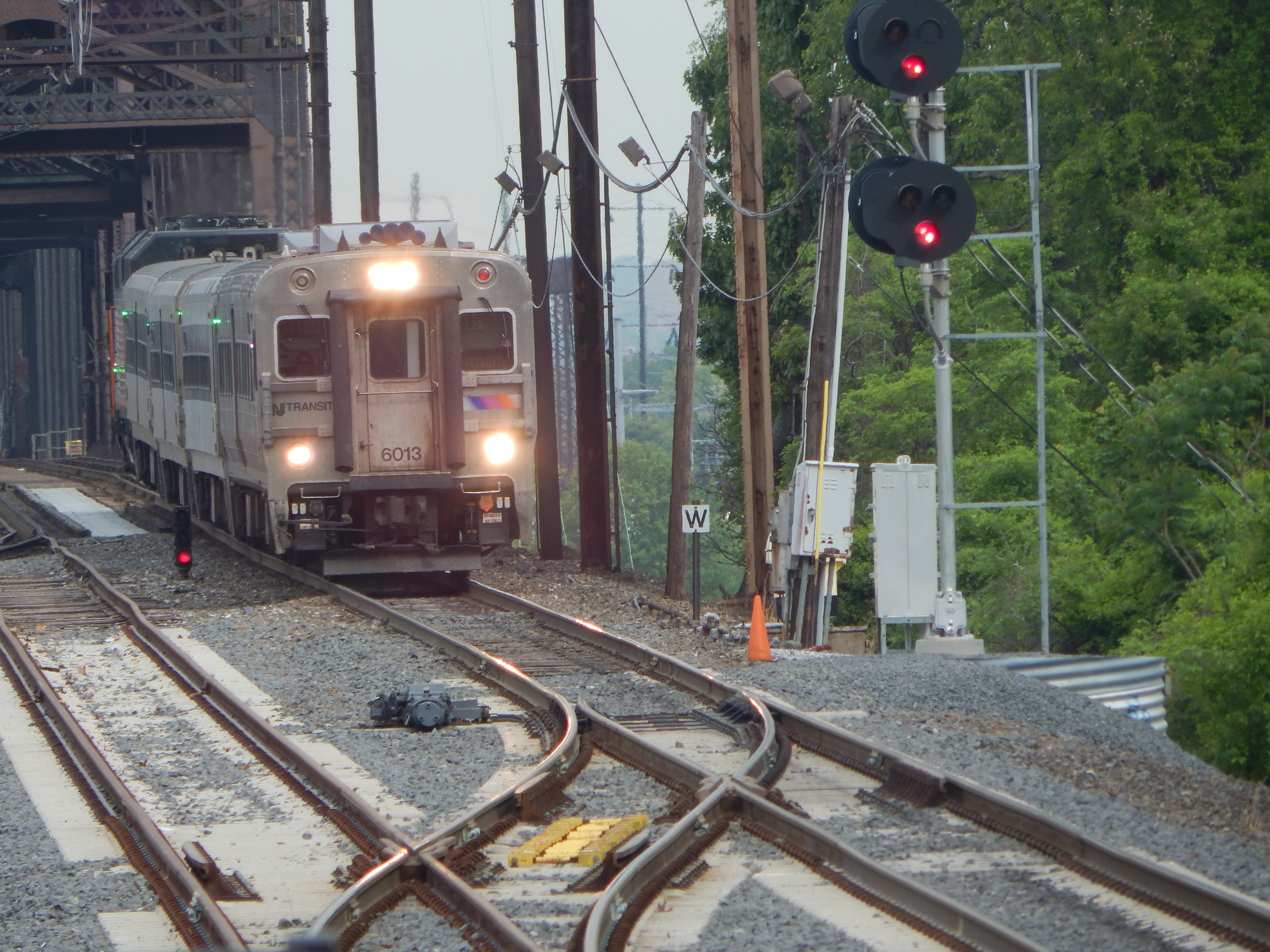
An NJT Atlantic City Line train on the bridge in 2015

In December 2011, an $18.5 million Transportation Investment Generating Economic Recovery (TIGER) grant was awarded to South Jersey Port Corporation by the United States Department of Transportation, partially for rehabilitation of the bridge. The improvements were completed.

== See also ==
- List of bridges documented by the Historic American Engineering Record in Pennsylvania
- List of crossings of the Delaware River
