= Millville and Glassboro Railroad =

Overview
- Dates of operation: 1859–1868
- Successor: West Jersey Railroad

Technical
- Track gauge: 1,435 mm (4 ft 8 1/2 in)
- Length: 22.25 miles (35.81 km)

The Millville and Glassboro Railroad was a railway company in the United States. It was incorporated in 1859 and began operating between Millville, New Jersey, and Glassboro, New Jersey, in 1860. The company was merged into the West Jersey Railroad, a forerunner of the Pennsylvania-Reading Seashore Lines, in 1868. Today its line is part of the Vineland Secondary.

== History ==
The Millville and Glassboro Railroad was incorporated on March 9, 1859. Its backers were based in Millville, New Jersey, who hoped to connect with the West Jersey Railroad, then building south from Woodbury, New Jersey. George Brooke Roberts, a future president of the Pennsylvania Railroad, oversaw the construction of the line, which opened between Millville and Glassboro, New Jersey, in October 1860. The West Jersey Railroad reached Glassboro in April 1861, creating a link between Millville and Camden, New Jersey.

Even as construction of the original line proceeded, the New Jersey Legislature authorized a southern extension to Cape May, New Jersey. Some construction took place, but the line was never completed because of insufficient capital. The legislature transferred the Cape May franchise to the Cape May and Millville Railroad on March 9, 1863. The company opened its line between Millville and Cape May in August 1863. The West Jersey Railroad acquired the Millville and Glassboro Railroad on April 1, 1868, and leased the Cape May and Millville Railroad on June 1, 1868.
