= Anglesea Railroad =

Overview
- Dates of operation: 1882–1888
- Successor: West Jersey Railroad

Technical
- Track gauge: 1,435 mm (4 ft 8 1/2 in)
- Length: 7.1 miles (11.4 km)

The Anglesea Railroad was a railway company in the United States. It was incorporated in 1882 and opened to Anglesea, New Jersey, in 1883. It was later extended to Holly Beach, New Jersey. The company went bankrupt in 1884 and was acquired by the West Jersey Railroad, a forerunner of the Pennsylvania-Reading Seashore Lines, in 1888.

== History ==
The principal figure behind the Anglesea Railroad was Frederick E. Swope, a real estate developer who also owned the Anglesea Land Company. The Anglesea Railroad was incorporated on November 20, 1882. Starting from Burleigh, New Jersey, on the West Jersey Railroad, the company built east across Grassy Sound to Anglesea, New Jersey. This initial line opened in July 1883.

The company was not a financial success. The poor quality of the roadbed earned it the sobriquet "Mud Hen." The company entered receivership on December 25, 1884. A 3-mile (4.8 km) extension to Holly Beach, New Jersey, opened in 1885. The West Jersey Railroad acquired the company on May 23, 1888.

Under the West Jersey and Seashore Railroad the Anglesea Railroad's line was known as the Five Mile Beach Branch. The line was abandoned following the creation of the Pennsylvania-Reading Seashore Lines in 1933.
