= Salem Railroad =

Overview
- Parent company: West Jersey Railroad (1868–1887)
- Dates of operation: 1856–1887
- Successor: West Jersey Railroad

Technical
- Track gauge: 1,435 mm (4 ft 8 1/2 in)
- Length: 17.1 miles (27.5 km)

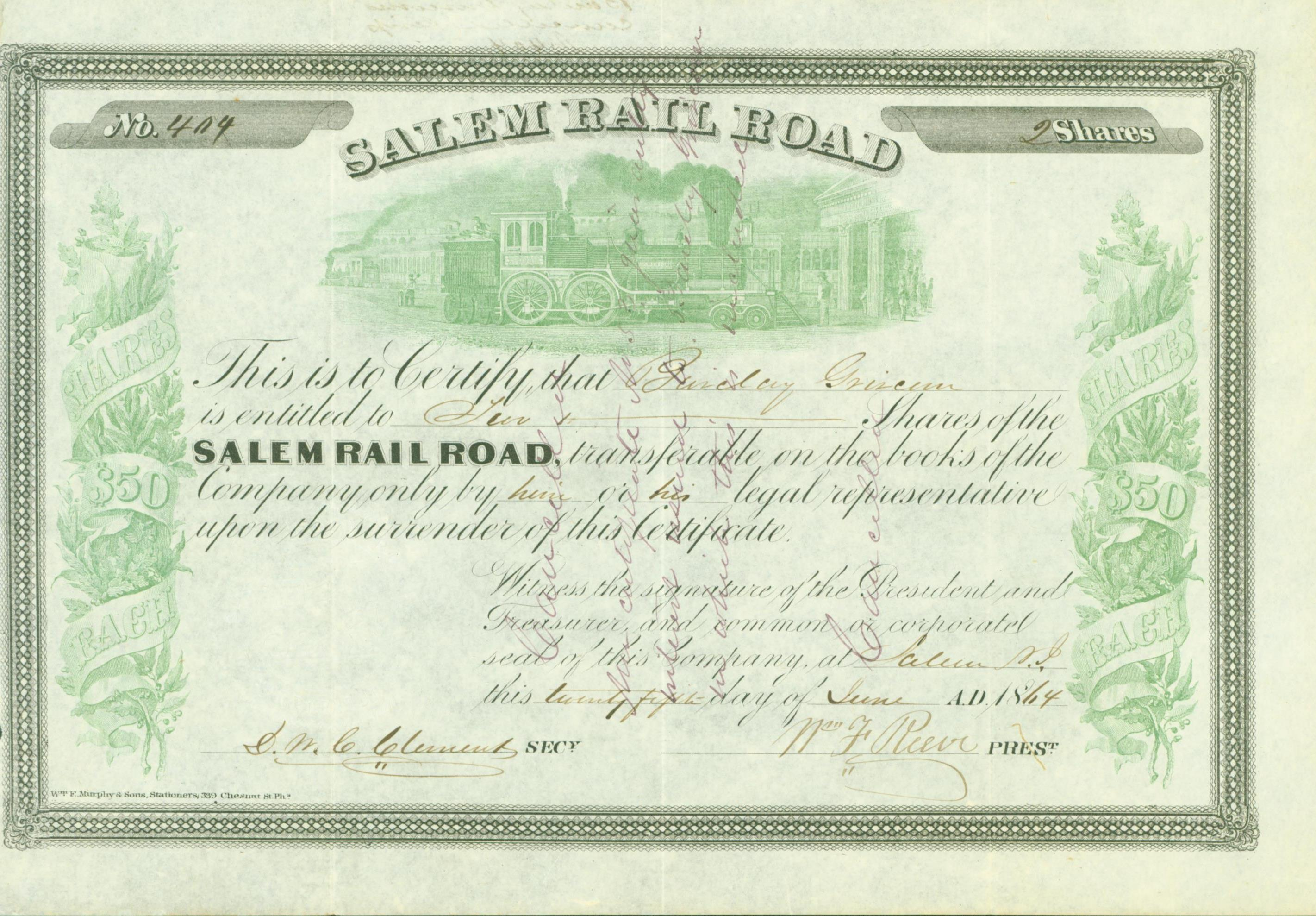
Share of the Salem Rail Road, issued 25 June 1864

The Salem Railroad was a railway company in the United States. It was incorporated in 1857 and completed a line between Salem and Elmer, New Jersey, in 1863. In Elmer, it connected with the Bridgeton Branch of the West Jersey Railroad. The West Jersey, a forerunner of the Pennsylvania-Reading Seashore Lines, leased the company in 1868 and consolidated it in 1887.

== History ==
Salem is the county seat of Salem County, New Jersey, and a port on the Delaware River. Local interests desired a year-round transport connection, and the Salem Railroad was incorporated on March 14, 1856. To the east, the West Jersey Railroad opened the Bridgeton Branch between Glassboro and Bridgeton in July 1861. The Salem Railroad began building west from Elmer, on the Bridgeton Branch, on August 31. Trains began running between Elmer and Yorketown on January 14, 1863, and all the way to Salem on July 1.

The West Jersey Railroad leased the Salem Railroad on January 1, 1868. The completion of the Woodstown and Swedesboro Railroad's line between in 1883 created a more direct route between Salem and Camden. The Salem Railroad, Swedesboro Railroad, Woodstown and Swedesboro Railroad, Maurice River Railroad, Salem Branch Railroad, and West Jersey Terminal Railroad were consolidated with the West Jersey Railroad on December 31, 1887.

Under the Pennsylvania-Reading Seashore Lines the Salem Railroad's line was administratively split:

- the Salem Branch, incorporating the Salem Railroad's line between Salem and Riddleton, and the lines of the Swedesboro Railroad and Woodstown and Swedesboro Railroad.
- the Riddleton Branch, incorporating the Salem Railroad's line between Riddleton and Elmer.
