= Tuckerton Railroad =

Railway line in New Jersey, United States

Overview
- Headquarters: Tuckerton
- Locale: mid-coastal New Jersey
- Dates of operation: 1871–1940

Technical
- Track gauge: 4 ft 8 1/2 in (1,435 mm) standard gauge

The Tuckerton Railroad (reporting mark TRR) was a railroad that operated in New Jersey from 1871 to 1936. The Southern New Jersey Railroad operated part of the line from 1937 to 1940.

Rail map of southern New Jersey, showing the Tuckerton in black

== History ==
=== 19th century ===
In 1871, the railroad was brought to Tuckerton, largely thanks to Tuckerton natives Archelaus Pharo and Theophilus T. Price. The train initially ran a short track including West Creek, Manahawkin, Barnegat, Beach Haven, and Whiting. It was later expanded with tracks connecting to New York, Trenton, and Philadelphia.

Tuckerton Railroad (TRR) was built from Whiting to Tuckerton with 50 lb rail. Two 4-4-0 wood-burning engines were ordered. The track was built past Tuckerton station to the waterfront at Edge Cove for connections to steamships that took vacationers to Long Beach Island during the summer months. Connections with the Pemberton and New York Railroad, later part of the Pennsylvania Railroad (PRR), the New Jersey Southern Railroad (NJS), and the Central Railroad of New Jersey (CNJ), were made at Whiting. The route from Whiting toward the coast traverses part of the Pine Barrens region.

In 1872, the Toms River and Waretown Railroad (TR&W) was built and physically connected with the TRR at Waretown Jct. and was leased to the NJS.

From 1872 to 1874, Tuckerton RR ran through trains 55 miles from Tuckerton to Toms River via rights over the TR&W.

In 1874, TRR officials discussed options of building a track to Trenton.

In 1879, TR&W built an extension to Barnegat, running parallel with the TRR for about 2 miles.

In 1881, PRR built a line from Whiting to Toms River and across the bay to Seaside Park and Bay Head Jct. to connect with the NY&LB. This opened up resorts north of Long Beach Island to Philadelphia traffic.

In 1884, Engine No. 3, which burnt coal instead of wood, was ordered from Baldwin to handle the planned construction of the Long Beach Railroad.

From 1885 to 1886, the Long Beach Railroad was graded, and a trestle was built from Manahawkin to Long Beach Island. It was built with 60 lb rail on the island connecting Barnegat City to Beach Haven, and leased to the PRR.

In 1887, dissatisfaction with the long route via Whiting led to the planning of a 32-mile shortcut from Medford to Manahawkin to shorten the time to Long Beach Island, but the line was not built. During the same year, TRR purchased a caboose.

In 1889, Locomotive No. 4, another 4-4-0 coal-burning engine, was ordered. Engine No. 1 was converted to coal, No. 2 needed to be rebuilt and got sidelined, and No. 3 was reported as overworked. Combine No. 5 and Coach No. 6 were purchased from the PRR.

In 1891, Engine No. 2 was not rebuilt, and instead, the TRR purchased another 4-4-0, No. 5.

In 1892, TRR owned 9 box cars and 11 flat cars. LBI traffic was noted as being less than expected and caused a drain on resources for the TRR.

In 1893, a shortcut was planned again. The panic of 1893 terminated any future discussions regarding new routes. The Barnegat City branch was foreclosed by the Pennsylvania Railroad (PRR), and all train service on it was terminated.

In 1894, the Long Beach Railroad was officially dissolved and broken into two pieces.

The connecting track from Manahawkin to Barnegat City Junction and the southern section to Beach Haven was reorganized as the Philadelphia and Beach Haven Railroad. This line was then leased to the PRR.

The northern portion was reorganized as the Barnegat Railroad. The PRR owned all the rolling stock.

The Manahawkin and Long Beach Transportation Company was created to run trains from Barnegat City Junction to Barnegat City, since the PRR (and thus TRR) would not run trains to Barnegat City anymore.

In 1894, TRR Engines No. 1 and 2 were scrapped.

In 1895, a fire in Tuckerton damaged Engines No. 3 and 4, leaving only Engine No. 5 in service.

In 1900, through passenger service was established by the PRR between Camden and Beach Haven, with fares set at $2 for a round-trip ticket. Among the people riding the train to Beach Haven in subsequent years was the family of author Catherine Drinker Bowen. She described her family's annual June trip to their summer house as "... the trip down began for us in a ferryboat from Philadelphia to Camden, then the dusty, cindery cars, very stuffy until we reached the bridge and the bay, when a life-giving air came suddenly, as if someone opened a door."

=== 20th century ===
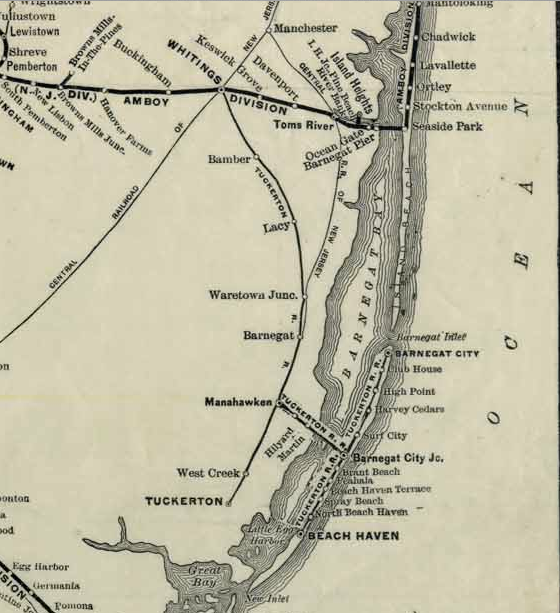
1911 map of PRR lines showing Tuckerton RR at right

In 1908, PRR canceled the Manahawkin & Long Beach Transportation Company's lease of Barnegat Railroad due to track conditions. The TRR began operating this line again.

In 1910, a new Engine No. 6, 4-4-0 American style, replaced 25-year-old Engine No. 3.

In 1912, freight receipts began to outpace passenger receipts.

By 1913, there were three round trips scheduled between Whiting and Beach Haven as passenger traffic slowly increased. PRR cooperated with the TRR and installed a block signal system between Whiting and Beach Haven for the summer months. In the winter, the equipment was removed and stored for the next season. The track in Whiting was reconfigured, and the wye was eliminated. A turntable was installed to be able to turn engines. Speed limits on the line from Whiting to Manahawkin were set at 60 MPH to match the PRR's line from Camden.

In 1914, the first automobile bridge was completed from the mainland to Long Beach Island.

In 1915, TRR purchased a steel suburban MP54 coach from PRR, which became No. 7.

In 1917, World War I caused a major drop in passengers to the shore.

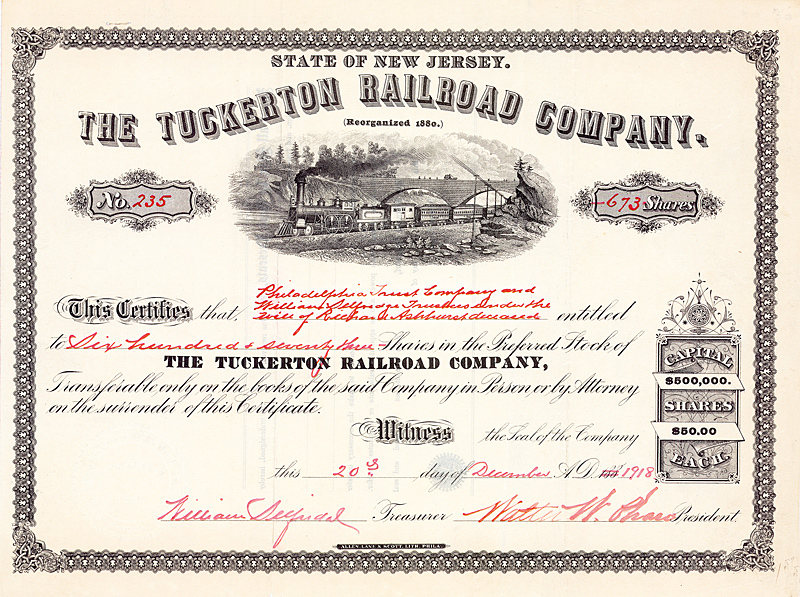
share of the Tuckerton Railroad Company from 20. December 1918

In 1918, federal control of all railroads in America due to World War I affected the Tuckerton Railroad. Engine No. 7, a 4-6-0, was ordered, while Engine No. 4 was sold.

In 1923, the Barnegat Railroad was officially abandoned, and tracks were quickly removed. Passenger volume slowly fell.

In 1925, freight tonnage almost doubled with shipments of cement, sand, fill, and stone for the new NJ State Highway No. 9 which ran parallel to the TRR.

In 1926, passenger volumes declined rapidly.

In 1927, Coach No. 7 returned to PRR to become PRR No. 389.

In 1929, passenger totals for the year were only 20% of 1920 figures. The TRR had higher than average freight tonnage due to the building of the automobile causeway to Long Beach Island. A second-hand engine was purchased, No. 14, a 4-4-0 type. Remaining passengers were accommodated on a borrowed PRR MPBM54 passenger-baggage-mail combine, usually No. 5208.

1930 was the last year of TRR profitability.

In 1931, bus service was coordinated with the PRR for trains at Manahawkin to Beach Haven. TRR combine No. 5 was dismantled. Coach No. 6 was used as a caboose but was eventually sidelined and never used again. Engine No. 14 overturned and was repaired, but a later grade-crossing accident put it out of service for good. Scheduled freight train service ended; all movements on the line were now by train order only.

In 1932, some TRR passenger trains only recorded an average of 2 passengers per day.

In 1933, the TRR was mortgaged and the bank's name "Camden Safe Deposit & Trust Company" was painted under the railroad's name on most equipment. Weekday passenger service to Long Beach Island was terminated, while weekend service continued.

On November 16, 1935, a nor'easter struck the Long Beach Island area. Engine No. 7, with a freight train, made its way from Beach Haven across the bridge to the mainland despite waves breaking over the rails. The next day, a tidal swell washed away the bridge to Long Beach Island, effectively ending all service, along with stranding a lone, empty gondola car on the island. The gondola car was retrieved by truck, one trip for the body and a second trip for the trucks.

In 1936, Tuckerton Railroad requested abandonment proceedings. Alternatives to TRR operations were considered by the on-line businesses. The most likely carrier would have been the Central Railroad of New Jersey (reporting mark CNJ), operating the line from its Toms River branch which terminated in Barnegat. The CNJ declined, stating the time to get to Barnegat was already 8 hours, and a trip further to Tuckerton and back would have required overtime hours, and that would have not been profitable for the little traffic moved.

On January 31, 1936, the last train ran on the TRR.

On March 26, 1936, H. E. Salzberg Co, a salvage firm, bought the assets of the TRR with intent to operate or salvage the line.

In 1937, the new operator was named as Southern New Jersey Railroad Company, Inc. (SNJ), as repairs to Engines No. 5 and 6 stored in Tuckerton began. The connection at Barnegat with the CNJ was used, enabling abandonment of the Barnegat to Whiting part of the line. Rails were removed from Long Beach Island. In 1938, SNJ showed a small profit of $616.

There was a NRHS railfan trip on the SNJ on April 16, 1939. CNJ Blue Comet equipment showed up in Barnegat and SNJ Engine No. 5 and 6 took the coaches to Tuckerton.

In 1940, because traffic was minimal and expected traffic had moved to trucks, an application for abandonment of SNJ was submitted. The last revenue box car for Tuckerton on SNJ was shipped August 20. Scrapping of the line began. Engine No. 5 pulled the scrapping train towards the CNJ's Barnegat interchange. When the scrapping was finished, old Engine No. 5, 50 years old at this point, was cut up on site in Barnegat.

In 1941, the last shipment from SNJ, consisting of three cars of scrap, left Barnegat January 16.

In 1973, the last piece of TRR track, used in Barnegat as a siding by the CNJ, was taken up in the spring.

=== 21st century ===
In 2007, the Jersey Shore Live Steam Organization, a 501c non profit organization, planned to rebuild the Tuckerton Railroad in 1/8 scale in a 64-acre park in New Gretna, New Jersey.

== Works cited ==
- Bowen, Catherine Drinker (1970). Family Portrait. Boston: Little, Brown. LCCN 75-105569.
- Brinckmann, John (1992). The Tuckerton Railroad: A Chronicle of Transport to the New Jersey Seashore (2nd ed.). J. Brinckmann.
- Treese, Lorett (2006). Railroads of New Jersey: Fragments of the Past in the Garden State Landscape. Mechanicsburg, Pennsylvania: Stackpole Books. ISBN 0-8117-3260-6.
