= Alloway and Quinton Railroad =

American railroad company

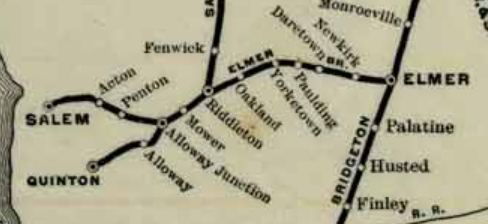
- The Quinton Branch, along with the Salem and Elmer Branches on a 1911 map produced by the Pennsylvania Railroad

Overview
- Locale: Salem County, New Jersey, U.S.
- Dates of operation: December 21, 1891–May 4, 1896 (as separate company)
- Successor: West Jersey and Seashore Railroad

Technical
- Length: 4.22 mi (6.79 km)

The Alloway and Quinton Railroad was a railroad company in the eponymous townships of Alloway and Quinton, Salem County, New Jersey. A 4.22-mile (6.79 km) branch off the West Jersey and Seashore Railroad, the railroad served only as a small branch to Quinton, with a single stop at Alloway in between the termini. At the Quinton end of the railroad was the Quinton Glass Company, which operated by rail rather than by water. The line also served passenger service from its opening until April 29, 1928. The West Jersey Railroad authorized construction of the branch to Quinton on January 30, 1891. The state of New Jersey incorporated the Alloway and Quinton Railroad on an official basis on July 7 and the company came together officially on July 13 at a meeting in Camden. The railroad opened on December 21, 1891 but the West Jersey Railroad would not sign a formal agreement until January 1, 1892 to operate the branch. On May 4, 1896, the Alloway and Quinton Railroad was one of six railroads merged to become the West Jersey and Seashore Railroad, which would operate the line as the Quinton Branch.

Due to the lack of a railroad yard and turning facilities at Quinton, trains on the Quinton and Alloway Railroad were required to run tender-first on the way back to Alloway Junction. The operation of the railroad in this fashion led to a fatal accident on September 18, 1914 when a tender-first engine flipped over an embankment in Alloway. Mixed use passenger and freight service ended due to low ridership in April 1928 and the trains were converted into freight only trains. The line was officially abandoned in 1941 and the tracks were torn up by 1942.

== History ==
As originally operated by the West Jersey Railroad, trains were locally based and made four round trips per day (except Sunday) between Alloway Junction and Quinton. Trains later operated at the same frequency between Salem and Quinton, with an extra Saturday trip. With no facilities for turning engines at Quinton, locomotives had to run backwards along the branch in one direction during a round trip. Running tender first on September 18, 1914, the last train of the day was heading from Quinton back towards Alloway when it reached a grade crossing. At the grade crossing, the engine derailed and jumped off the track for 180 feet (55 m). At that point, the locomotive fell 12 feet (3.7 m) down an embankment and flipped over with the exception of the tender. The engine pulled a baggage car down the embankment with it while the tender remained perpendicular on the tracks. The other cars were left in the area of the tracks, but damaged the right-of-way. Frank Treen, the 22-year old locomotive fireman from Salem, was riding on the side of the engine and was crushed by the flipped engine. The pressure crushed and disfigured his body into the ground below, but he survived the initial accident. Treen died while they were digging him out of the embankment. The engineer escaped major injury by jumping from the locomotive before it turned over. The two passengers in the train were unharmed along with the crew on the cars. Treen's funeral was held in Camden.

=== Decline and discontinuation ===
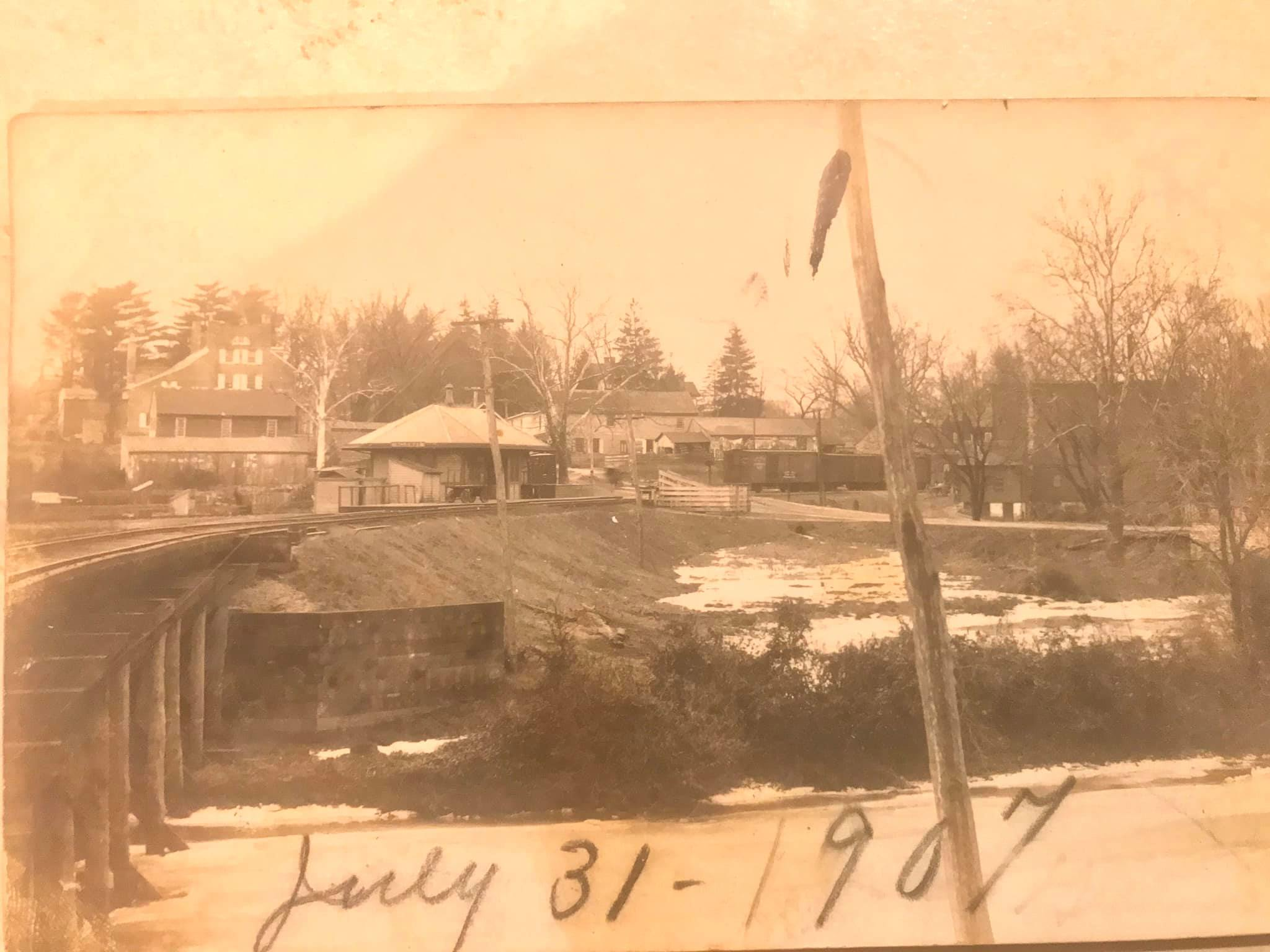
Alloway station on July 31, 1907 from a nearby railroad bridge

Despite being considered the richest part of Salem County, service on the Quinton Branch became a struggle by September 1926. With competition from buses for passenger service and trucks for freight such as express and milk deliveries, the railroad found the branch an unprofitable venture. The West Jersey and Seashore Railroad had vociferous opposition to eliminate service on the branch, but the railroad insisted on cutting services. On September 7, the railroad filed a petition with the Board of the Public Utilities Commission to change operations on the Quinton Branch, requesting elimination of two passenger trains (no. 2100 and no. 2103) and discontinuation of all express freight and milk services.

In January 1927, the Board of Public Utilities Commissioners approved the railroad's request to discontinue trains 2100 and 2103 because that both trains have an average of five passenger and that the railroad was operating at a cost that was almost seven times its revenue. No objections were placed to the discontinuation of the freight service in favor of railroad service compared to a similar petition in 1924. They added that the meat dealership of John Dunham in Alloway Township was the primary freight shippers on the line and that there was a lot of freight compared to the express and passenger service. However, objection was offered about the discontinuation of the two passenger trains. The Board felt that there was no expectation of further growth to force the railroad to maintain the extra service. The order was declared to be official as of April 24, 1927. As part of these changes, the railroad would have milk service dealt with by truck from Daretown and Elmer before continuing on to Monroeville via train. The two remaining passenger trains would run from Glassboro station to Quinton, reaching Elmer at 10:19 a.m. (from Glasboro) and at 3:25 p.m. (to Glassboro) respectively. Starting on January 25, the two remaining trains (no. 2101 and no. 2102) would operate as a mixed passenger and freight train.

In mid-February, officials from the West Jersey and Seashore held a meeting at Daretown to discuss the plans for April 24. At this meeting was several local farmers and other freight shippers who wanted to know what the plan was in terms of milk, express service and mail service along the Quinton Branch. The officials stated that the railroad would provide truck service at Daretown but that they had not finished plans for the new freight operation yet. They added that a truck would meet the 7:46 a.m. train to Philadelphia, Pennsylvania at Elmer station and will come with the early mail. No plans were expected to be set for late evening mail service as local residents already did not have service in the evening. By late March, the railroad officials went to Daretown and nearby Yorktown to meet with the postmasters in terms of the future of mail service in the area. The expectation was made that the bids will be requested to have trucks go between the two communities and Woodstown or via Elmer instead. The cuts went into effect officially on April 24, 1927.

On March 26, 1928, the railroad held a hearing with the Board in Camden to have all passenger service, which consisted of a passenger coach attached to a freight train, on the line discontinued. West Jersey and Seashore officials stated that for the entire month of February 1928, 23 passengers in total used the trains of the Quinton Branch (train no. 2101 with 11 the entire month and train no. 2102 with 12, respectively). No one attended the hearing on March 26 to oppose the discontinuation of railroad service, but a decision was not immediately made by the officials. The Board approved their petition on April 11, and set it to go in effect as of April 29, 1928. Passenger service on the Quinton Branch was discontinued on April 28, 1928.

In November 1928, the West Jersey and Seashore Railroad discontinued daily freight service to Quinton, reducing the line to as needed. The only remaining freight service was the canning factory in Quinton, which would get service when there was a need for a freight train and at that point it would arrive at 10:00 p.m. This train would have one car loaded up and depart for Alloway Junction. The station agents at Alloway Junction and Quinton stations were eliminated on December 22 as part of another petition to the Board of Public Utility Commissioners.

The closing of the Quinton Glass Company had left the branch with largely agricultural traffic, which in turn had largely been lost to improved roads by the 1930s. A storm in September 1940 resulted in serious flood damage along Alloway Creek, washing the station onto the tracks and destroying the trestle over the creek.

The West Jersey and Seashore Railroad and its parent company Pennsylvania-Reading Seashore Lines voted to have the railroad branch abandoned entirely on February 3, 1941. The final authorization for it came on April 18. The railroads then filed to have the Quinton Branch abandoned in its entirety with the Interstate Commerce Commission (ICC) on April 30. The railroad claimed that the remaining freight service on the branch had been a financial loss for several years and that the glass manufacturing in the region had dwindled. They added that vehicles had already gotten control of most freight offered on the branch. The railroad noted that the only existing business on the branch at that point was a small set of inbound freight services. The ICC requested that the railroad provide the financial details directly to them before making any decisions.

With the flood damage from September 1940, the railroad stated that it would cost $72,600 (1941 USD) to restore the branch to operation. Their argument was that the freight serviced by the railroad, a meatpacking plant, coal and lumberyard in Alloway and the cannery and municipal waterworks in Quinton would get better service if moved by trucks instead of railroad cars. They added that the salvage value after abandonment of the railroad would be about $3,900. The official hearing was held on October 1 and the ICC agreed that the railroad did not need to operate the branch. The Commission added that the restoration of the branch to operational status would place a burden on the railroad and interstate commerce. The order was made official on October 22, 1941 and that the order would be effective November 7.

== Stations ==
| Station | Location | Opened | Agency closed | Station closed | Notes |
|---|---|---|---|---|---|
| Alloway Junction | Alloway Township | December 21, 1891 | December 22, 1928 | April 28, 1928 | Connection available to the Salem Branch |
| Alloway | Alloway Township | December 21, 1891 | | April 28, 1928 | The station at Alloway contained a 20-by-40-foot (6.1 m × 12.2 m) passenger depot, a sectional tool house and a milk platform. |
| Quinton | Quinton Township | December 21, 1891 | December 22, 1928 | April 28, 1928 | The station at Quinton contained an 18-by-30-foot (5.5 m × 9.1 m) passenger depot and a 17-by-18-foot (5.2 m × 5.5 m) freight house. There was also a milk platform at the station. |

== See also ==
- Salem Railroad

== Bibliography ==
- Interstate Commerce Commission (1942). Decisions of the Interstate Commerce Commission of the United States (Finance Reports): June 1941–January 1942. Washington D.C.: United States Government Printing Office.
- New Jersey State Board of Assessors (1915). Thirty-first Annual Report of the State Board of Assessors of the State of New Jersey For the Year 1914. Paterson, New Jersey: News Printing Company.
