= Lodi Branch Railroad =

Map

The Lodi Branch Railroad Co, constructed and controlled by the New Jersey and New York Railroad and then leased by the New York, Susquehanna and Western Railway and then the Erie Railroad, was a short east–west branch line, around 2 miles long, from the Williams Ave Depot in Hasbrouck Heights, New Jersey westward to the Lodi station at Main Street in Lodi, New Jersey, United States.

On paper, the Lodi Branch was a separate entity from the NJ&NY, which made it simple for the NYS&W to lease the entire line in 1883, but it was still necessary to exchange cars with the NJ&NY to bring them to the NYS&W main line in Hackensack where there was a junction.

In 1896, the NYS&W built a junction and a shorter northwards branch to its main line, called the Hackensack and Lodi Railroad. This was preferable for several reasons: better access to Hackensack, New Jersey, and smoother freight operations on both lines. The rest of the line to the NJ&NY was then abandoned.
