= Conrail Shared Assets Operations =

American railroad company

- Map

Overview
- Parent company: Norfolk Southern (58%); CSX Transportation (42%)
- Headquarters: Mount Laurel, New Jersey, U.S.
- Reporting mark: CRCX
- Locale: three separate networks, in the Detroit, Philadelphia, and Newark, New Jersey areas
- Dates of operation: June 1, 1999–present
- Predecessor: Conrail

Technical
- Track gauge: 4 ft 8 1/2 in (1,435 mm) standard gauge

Other
- Website: www.conrail.com

Conrail Shared Assets Operations (CSAO) is the commonly used name for modern-day Conrail (reporting mark CRCX), an American railroad company. It operates three networks, the North Jersey, South Jersey/Philadelphia, and Detroit Shared Assets Areas, where it serves as a contract local carrier and switching company for its owners, CSX Transportation and the Norfolk Southern Railway. When most of the former Conrail's track was split between these two railroads, the three shared assets areas (a total of about 1,200 miles of track) were kept separate to avoid giving one railroad an advantage in those areas. The company operates using its own employees and infrastructure but owns no equipment outside MOW equipment.

== North Jersey Shared Assets Area ==
The North Jersey Shared Assets Area stretches from the North Bergen Yard in North Bergen, New Jersey south into Jersey City and Newark, and beyond to Manville (Port Reading Junction) and Trenton, much of which is operated over Amtrak's Northeast Corridor and New Jersey Transit lines through trackage rights. Primary connections are to CSX's River Subdivision north to Albany, New York at North Bergen, NS's Southern Tier Line northwest to Buffalo, New York at Croxton Yard in Jersey City, NS's Lehigh Line west to Allentown, Pennsylvania and CSX's Trenton Subdivision southwest to Philadelphia at Manville, and the Conrail South Jersey/Philadelphia Shared Assets Area at Trenton. Oak Island Yard in Newark is the principal yard for the region with smaller ones at Bayonne, Greenville (Jersey City), Linden, Manville, Metuchen, Newark, Old Bridge, and Port Reading in Woodbridge.

- Center Street Branch, Kearny Meadows, "P&HL", Centre Street Bridge (demolished)
- Passaic and Harsimus Line "P&HL", formerly Northeast Corridor at Waverly Yard In Newark, New Jersey, now Oak Island Yard to Jersey City
  - Northern Running Track "NRTB", from 'CP Hack' and interchange with Passaic and Harsimus Line with connections to Marion Junction, New Jersey, Croxton Yard, interchange with New York Susquehanna & Western at 'CP West Croxton' and ending at 'CP-1' of CSX North Bergen Yard
- National Docks Branch "NATB", Northern Running Track at Bergen Junction, New Jersey to Upper Bay Bridge to Oak Island Yard
- Garden State Secondary formerly Chemical Coast Line "COAS", Oak Island Yard to North Jersey Coast Line at Perth Amboy
- Lehigh Line "LEHL", National Docks Branch, Bayonne to CSX Trenton Subdivision and NS Lehigh Line at Manville
- Perth Amboy Running Track, comes off Garden State Secondary to service industries in Perth Amboy, New Jersey.
- Amboy Secondary "AMBS" (Amboy Branch and Jamesburg Branch), from William to Midway Amtrak. Connects to NJ Transit North Jersey Coast Line via the Essay and Church Running Tracks in South Amboy, New Jersey.
- Sayreville Running Track, Gillespie Running Track and Phoenix Branch
- Southern Secondary "SOUS", trackage rights over NJ Transit's North Jersey Coast Line from South Amboy to Red Bank, New Jersey, to an interchange with the Delaware and Raritan River Railroad located in Red Bank.
- Port Reading Secondary "MANS", a line that runs from Port Reading Junction and Yard to Bound Brook where it connects with the Lehigh Line - recently upgraded and may lose its 'secondary' status.
- Staten Island Railroad "NOSL", from 'CP Ralph' in Elizabeth, NJ over the Arthur Kill Vertical Lift Bridge to Arlington Yard in Staten Island, NY including the Travis Industrial Track, which runs from Arlington Yard to a New York Department of Sanitation Waste Transfer Facility at Fresh Kills.
- Hightstown Industrial Track, an Industrial Track that runs from a junction with the Amboy Secondary in Jamesburg, NJ to Cranbury, NJ.
- Bonhamtown Branch, runs from NEC south of Metuchen station to Raritan Center, interchanges with Raritan Central Railway at Metuchen Yard.

== South Jersey/Philadelphia Shared Assets Area ==
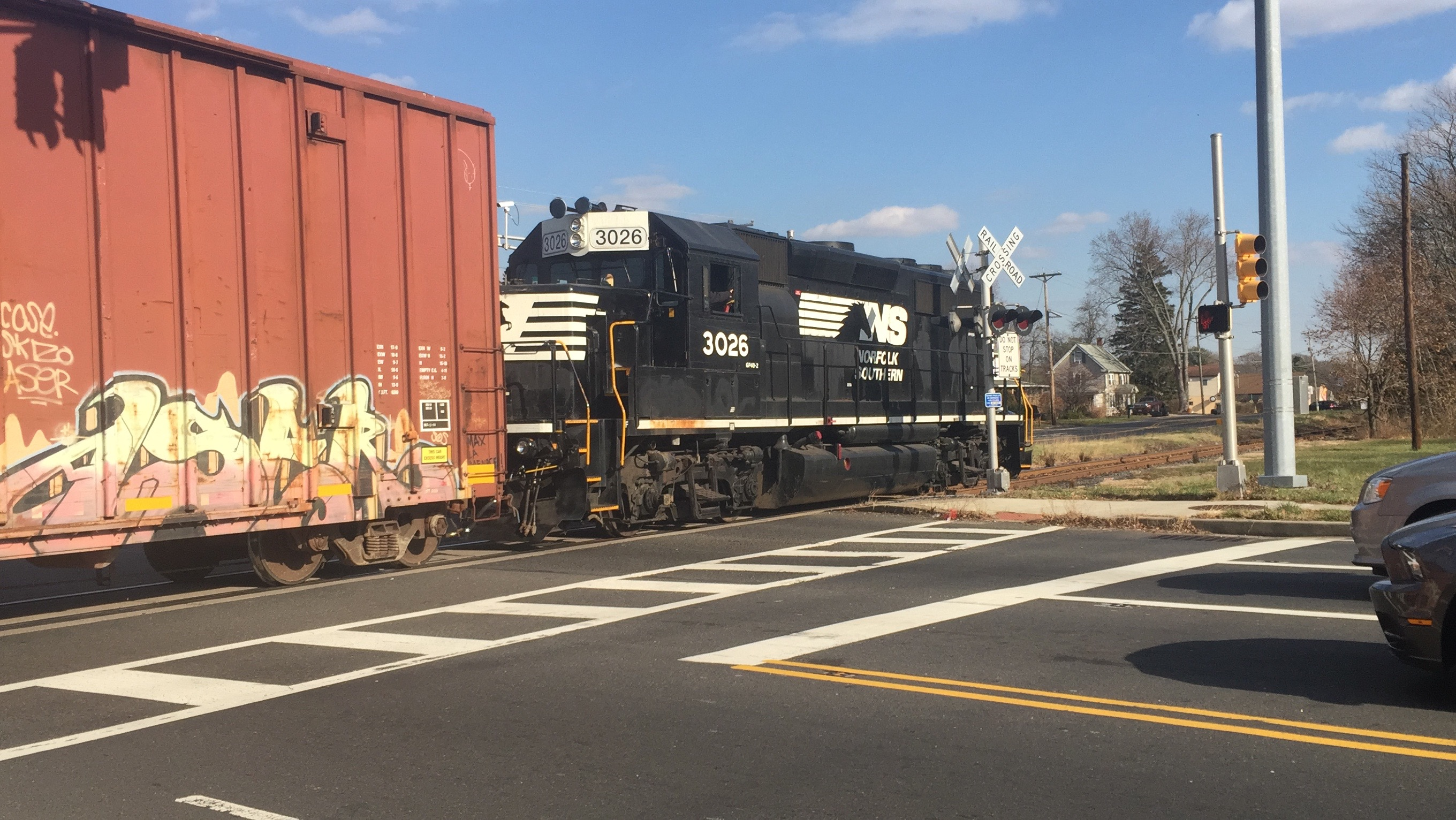
Conrail Shared Assets Operations freight train in Mount Laurel, New Jersey

The New Jersey Department of Transportation anticipated in 2010 increased freight activity in South Jersey that has led to capital improvement and expansion projects for this designated area.

The South Jersey/Philadelphia Shared Assets Area is operated out of Pavonia Yard in Camden, New Jersey, with smaller yards in Marcus Hook, Paulsboro, Millville, Morrisville, Frankford Junction, Burlington, Port Richmond and South Philadelphia.

- Atlantic City Line, trackage rights along New Jersey Transit from Bordentown Secondary at Delair, New Jersey to Winslow Junction, New Jersey
- Bordentown Secondary (Amboy Branch and Bordentown Branch), CP Hatch to Northeast Corridor at Millham in Trenton, New Jersey
  - Robbinsville Industrial Track, Bordentown Secondary at Bordentown, New Jersey to Yardville, New Jersey in Hamilton Township.
- Northeast Corridor, trackage rights along Amtrak (Northeast Corridor) from Northern New Jersey operations border at Princeton Junction, New Jersey to Philadelphia.
- Delair Branch, Pavonia Running tracks at CP Hatch Delair, New Jersey to CSX (Philadelphia Subdivision) at Park Junction in Philadelphia.
- Pemberton Industrial Track, runs from NJT CP Jordan (Pennsauken) to Hainesport, NJ.
- Beesley's Point Secondary, Vineland Secondary at CP Brown in Camden, New Jersey to Beesley's Point Industrial Track at Palermo, New Jersey. Primary trackage rights below Winslow, New Jersey to Palermo, New Jersey has been leased to the Cape May Seashore Lines as of 2022, but Conrail has retained secondary trackage rights depending on what happens with the shuttered B.L. England Generating Station site.
  - Beesley's Point Industrial Track, via Beesley's Point Secondary at Palermo to Beesley's Point, New Jersey
- Vineland Secondary, Camden Running track at CP Mill at the south end of Pavonia Yard in Camden to Millville, New Jersey
- Grenloch Industrial Track, Vineland Secondary in Gloucester City, New Jersey to the Interstate Business Park in Bellmawr, New Jersey.
- Penns Grove Secondary, Salem Secondary and Vineland Secondary at Woodbury, New Jersey to Deepwater Point Running Track at Penns Grove, New Jersey
  - Deepwater Point Running Track, Penns Grove Secondary at Penns Grove, New Jersey to Deepwater, New Jersey
- Salem Running Track, Penns Grove Secondary and Vineland Secondary at Woodbury, NJ to Swedesboro, NJ for a connection to the Southern Railroad of New Jersey's Salem Branch. Leased to SRNJ in 2018.
- Chester Secondary, CSX RG yard at Eastwick to SEPTA's Airport Line, Lester, and ends at Eddystone.

=== Delair Bridge ===
The south track at the Delair Lift Bridge (part of the Delair Branch) is used by Conrail; the north track is used by New Jersey Transit's Atlantic City Line.

== Detroit Shared Assets Area ==
The Detroit Shared Assets Area consists of:

- Detroit Line, from junction with Norfolk Southern Detroit Line in Gibraltar, Michigan at MP 20 to junction with Conrail North Yard Branch at CP-West Detroit.
- North Yard Branch, from junction with Conrail Detroit Line at CP-West Detroit to junction with Conrail Sterling Secondary at CP-North Yard.
- Sterling Secondary and Utica Industrial Track, from junction with the Conrail North Yard Branch at CP-North Yard to the end of the Utica Industrial Track at MP 27.
- Michigan Line (runs parallel to Michigan Avenue, US Hwy 12), CP-Townline in Dearborn (junction with Amtrak Michigan Line) to CP-Bay City Jct.
- Lincoln Secondary, from junction with CSXT Toledo Terminal Subdivision at Carleton to Ecorse Junction in Detroit. Trains can operate track authority EC-1 forms issued by the CSX RL Dispatcher located in Calumet City, Illinois.

CP-West Detroit, Delray, CP-YD, and River Rouge Yard lie close to each other on the Utica/MP 20 line, giving the whole a rough K-shape. Various spurs and industrial tracks branch off from this trackage. Mileage in both directions is measured from the Michigan Central Railway Tunnel.

== Locomotives ==
Conrail Shared Assets utilizes the following types of locomotives, all supplied by CSX and Norfolk Southern.

- EMD GP38-2
- EMD GP40-2
- EMD SD40-2
- EMD SD45-2
- EMD SD40E3
