= Raritan Center =

Business park in Middlesex County, New Jersey, US

Coordinates: 40.5224°N 74.3377°W

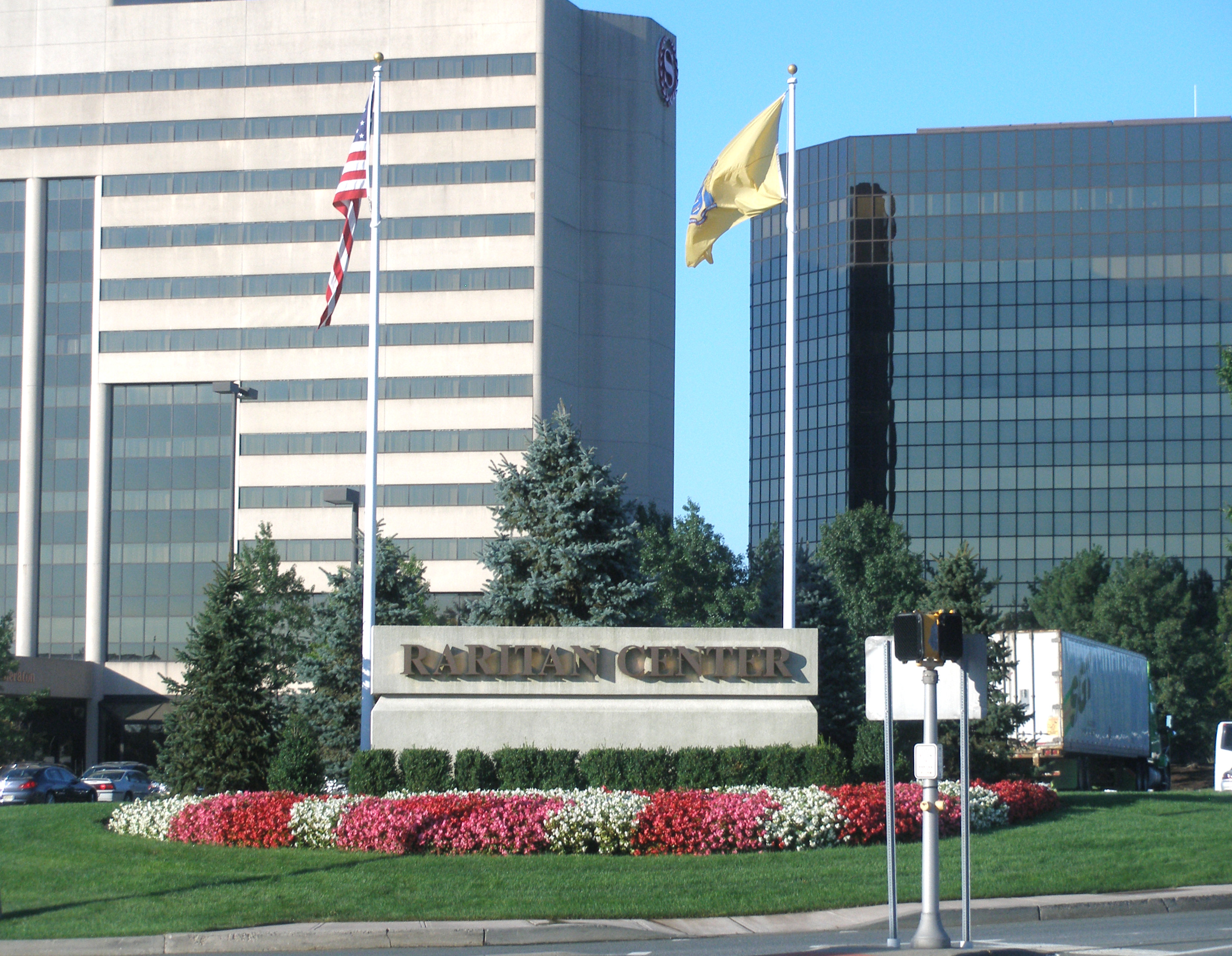
Entrance to Raritan Center

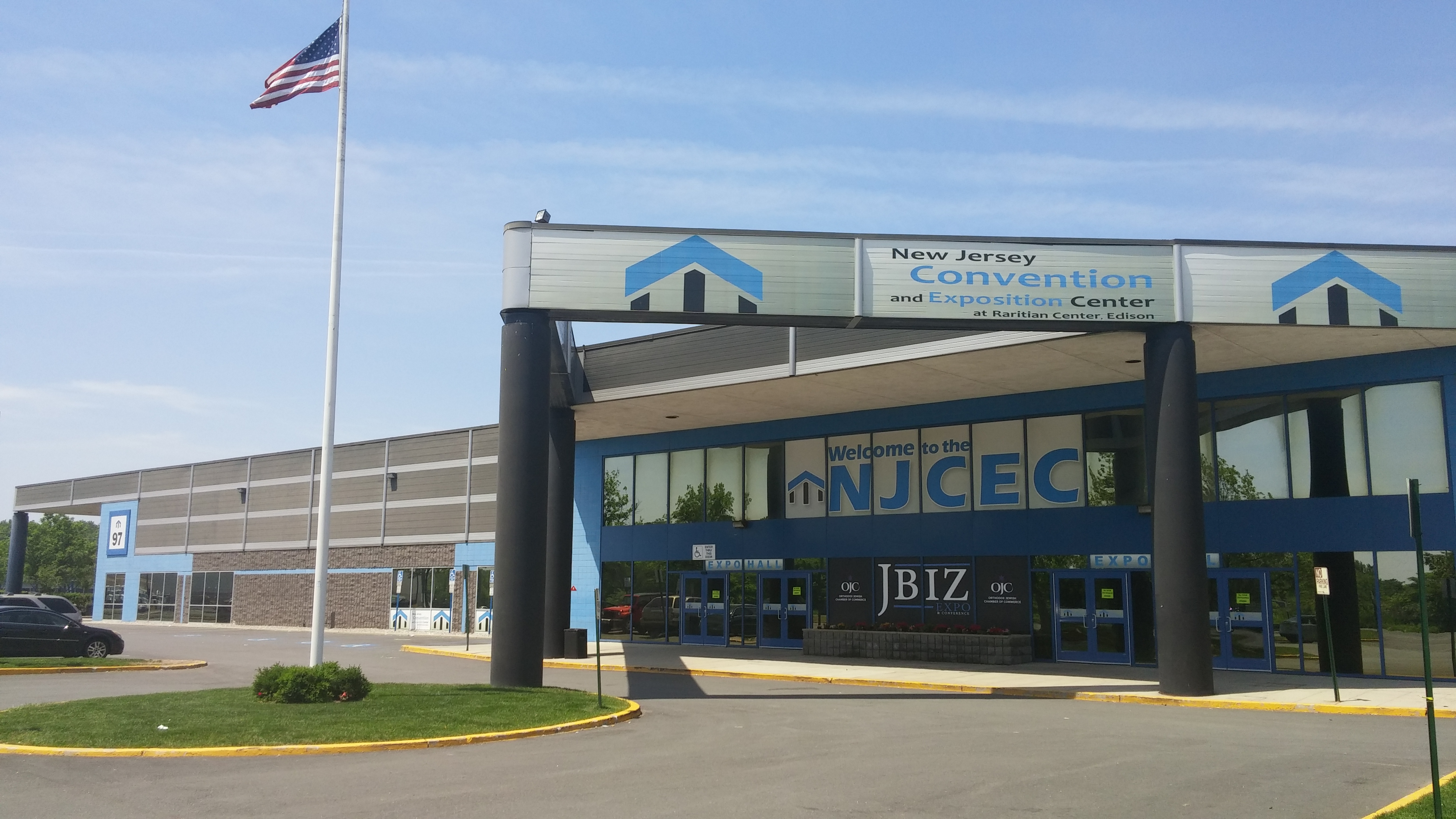
New Jersey Convention & Expo Center

Raritan Center is a business park located in Edison, New Jersey. Sited on part of the former Raritan Arsenal, the Raritan Center Business Park is a 2,300-acre (930 ha) logistics center with office buildings and millions of square feet of light manufacturing or distribution. It provides services for transload, cross-dock, warehousing and “3PL” service providers operations.

It is home to regional distribution facilities for organizations including Federal Express, CertainTeed, Arizona Beverage Company, United Parcel Service, among others. The newsroom of News 12 New Jersey and the New Jersey Convention & Expo Center are located at the center.

In 2012, Avidan Management built what was then the nation's largest solar rooftop installation at 17 acres (6.9 ha) at the center.
