= Ocean City Railroad (1884) =

Railroad company in New Jersey

Overview
- Parent company: West Jersey Railroad
- Dates of operation: 1884–1885
- Successor: West Jersey Railroad

Technical
- Track gauge: 1,435 mm (4 ft 8 1/2 in)
- Length: 11.25 miles (18.11 km)

The Ocean City Railroad was a railway company in the United States. It was incorporated in 1884 by the West Jersey Railroad to build an extension from Sea Isle City, New Jersey, to Ocean City, New Jersey. The line was completed in 1884 and the company was consolidated with the West Jersey Railroad in 1885. None of the line remains today.

== History ==
The West Jersey Railroad began building east from its main line at Sea Isle Junction toward Sea Isle City, New Jersey, in May 1881. The line, 4.8 miles (7.7 km) long, opened on June 26, 1882. (Note: Coverdale & Colpitts lists this branch with the Ocean City Railroad and not the West Jersey Railroad, despite the branch being completed two years prior to the Ocean City Railroad's incorporation. The Interstate Commerce Commission valuation report lists the West Jersey Railroad as the builder.) It incorporated the Ocean City Railroad on March 1, 1884, to extend the line up the Atlantic Coast to Ocean City, New Jersey. The 11.25-mile (18.11 km) extension opened in December 1884. The West Jersey Railroad consolidated the Ocean City Railroad on September 1, 1885.

In the rationalization that followed the creation of the Pennsylvania-Reading Seashore Lines in 1933, the former Ocean City Railroad line was abandoned between Sea Isle City and Ocean City in favor of the former Philadelphia and Seashore Railway route.
