= Maurice River Railroad =

Overview
- Dates of operation: 1887–1887
- Successor: West Jersey Railroad

Technical
- Track gauge: 1,435 mm (4 ft 8 1/2 in)
- Length: 9.71 miles (15.63 km)

The Maurice River Railroad was a railway company in the United States. It was incorporated in 1887 by the West Jersey Railroad to build a branch from Manumuskin, New Jersey, to Port Norris, New Jersey, along the Maurice River. The line was completed the same year and the company was merged into the West Jersey Railroad.

== History ==
In the nineteenth century the Delaware Bay was a significant source of oysters. Multiple railroads were built to Maurice River to gain access to this trade. The first such railroad to reach the river was the Bridgeton and Port Norris Railroad, which was funded by local interests and opened in 1872. The Central Railroad of New Jersey took control in 1887 and reorganized the company as the Cumberland and Maurice River Railroad.

The West Jersey Railroad responded by incorporating the Maurice River Railroad on June 7, 1887. The company's line ran 9.71 miles (15.63 km), starting from the West Jersey's main line at Manumuskin, New Jersey and proceeding along the east side of the Maurice River. The line was completed in November 1887, and the company was merged into the West Jersey Railroad on December 31.
