= Woodbury station =

Railway station in Woodbury, New Jersey

Woodbury
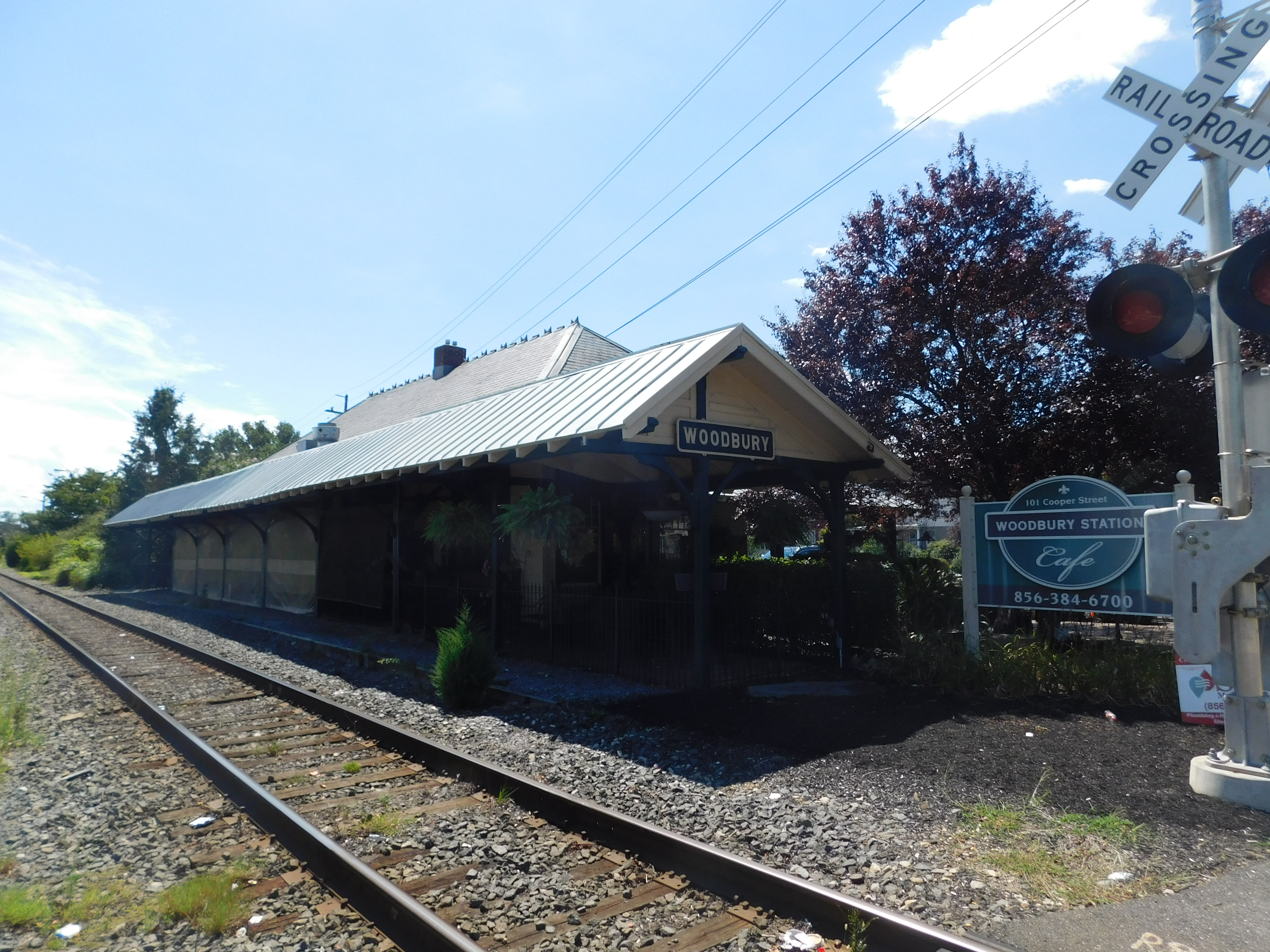
- Woodbury station in August 2022.

General information
- Location: Station Road at Cooper Street; Woodbury, New Jersey, US
- Coordinates: 39.836416°N 75.149699°W

History
- Opened: April 14, 1857
- Closed: February 5, 1971
- Electrified: 1910–1949

Former services
Preceding station	Pennsylvania-Reading Seashore Lines	Following station
North Woodbury toward Camden	WJ&S Camden – Millville	Woodbury Heights toward Millville
West End toward Penns Grove	WJ&S Penns Grove Branch	Terminus
Parkville toward Salem	Salem Branch	Terminus
Preceding station	Pennsylvania Railroad	Following station
North Woodbury toward Camden	Cape May Division Before 1932	Woodbury Heights toward Cape May
Location

Woodbury is a defunct commuter railroad station in the city of Woodbury, Gloucester County, New Jersey. Located at the junction of Station Road and Cooper Street, the station served multiple lines of the Pennsylvania-Reading Seashore Lines and the Pennsylvania Railroad. Trains out of Woodbury serviced lines to Salem, Millville, Penns Grove/Carneys Point and Cape May. Woodbury station consisted of two side platforms and a 72-by-20-foot (21.9 m × 6.1 m) brick station depot.

Railroad service at Woodbury station began on April 14, 1857 with the opening of the West Jersey Railroad between Camden and Woodbury. The current depot opened in 1883, designed in Stick style architecture. Service on the line to Penns Grove ended on July 8, 1950. Salem service ended on December 30 that same year. The final remaining passenger service (Camden–Millville) ended on February 5, 1971. The station depot currently serves as a restaurant.

Restoration of service at Woodbury station is proposed as part of the Glassboro–Camden Line, a light rail operation between the two eponmyous cities.

== History ==
The station stop was part of planned Camden and Woodbury Railroad, which began in 1837–1838 but ran irregularly and was later abandoned. The West Jersey Railroad (WJ) was granted its charter by the state of New Jersey on February 5, 1853, to build a line from Camden to Cape May. The directors of the company met on July 15, 1853, to select the route on which they would build. The line was built in stages with the backing of the Camden and Amboy from Camden to Glassboro. The first 8.2 miles (13.2 km) of the line using the abandoned Camden and Woodbury right-of-way opened on April 15, 1857.

Service was later expanded along the Penns Grove Branch and the Salem Branch, which converge just south of the station at Woodbury Junction. Through mergers and acquisitions the line became part of the West Jersey and Seashore Railroad and then Pennsylvania-Reading Seashore Lines. The line was electrified between 1906 and 1949. The power house north of the station was the last remnant of the electrified rail and was later demolished by Conrail. It later became diesel service.

Passenger service to Penns Grove ended on July 8, 1950. Service to Salem ended on December 30. The remaining passenger service through Woodbury ended on February 5, 1971. The station house, was built in 1883 in the Stick style, has since become a restaurant.

== Future ==
Woodbury

General information
- Location: Woodbury, New Jersey,
- System: Light rail
- Owner: NJ Transit
- Line: Glassboro–Camden Line
- Platforms: 1

Construction
- Parking: 600 (municipal)
- Accessible: yes

History
- Opened: 2028 (planned)

Proposed services
Preceding station	NJ Transit	Following station
Red Bank Avenue toward Walter Rand Transportation Center	Glassboro–Camden Line	Woodbury Heights toward Glassboro
Location

Woodbury is a planned station of the proposed Glassboro–Camden Line light rail system, to be located along the Vineland Secondary right-of way. The station design includes a platform station and park and ride. It would be a component of a potential Woodbury Transit Hub, part of transit-oriented development study.

== See also ==
- Glassboro station
- Sewell station
- Westville station

== Bibliography ==
- Wilson, William Bender (1899). History of the Pennsylvania Railroad Company With Plan of Organization, Portraits of Officials and Biographical Sketches · Volume 1. Philadelphia, Pennsylvania: Henry T. Coates & Company.
