= Sewell station =

Former railway station in New Jersey, United States

Sewell
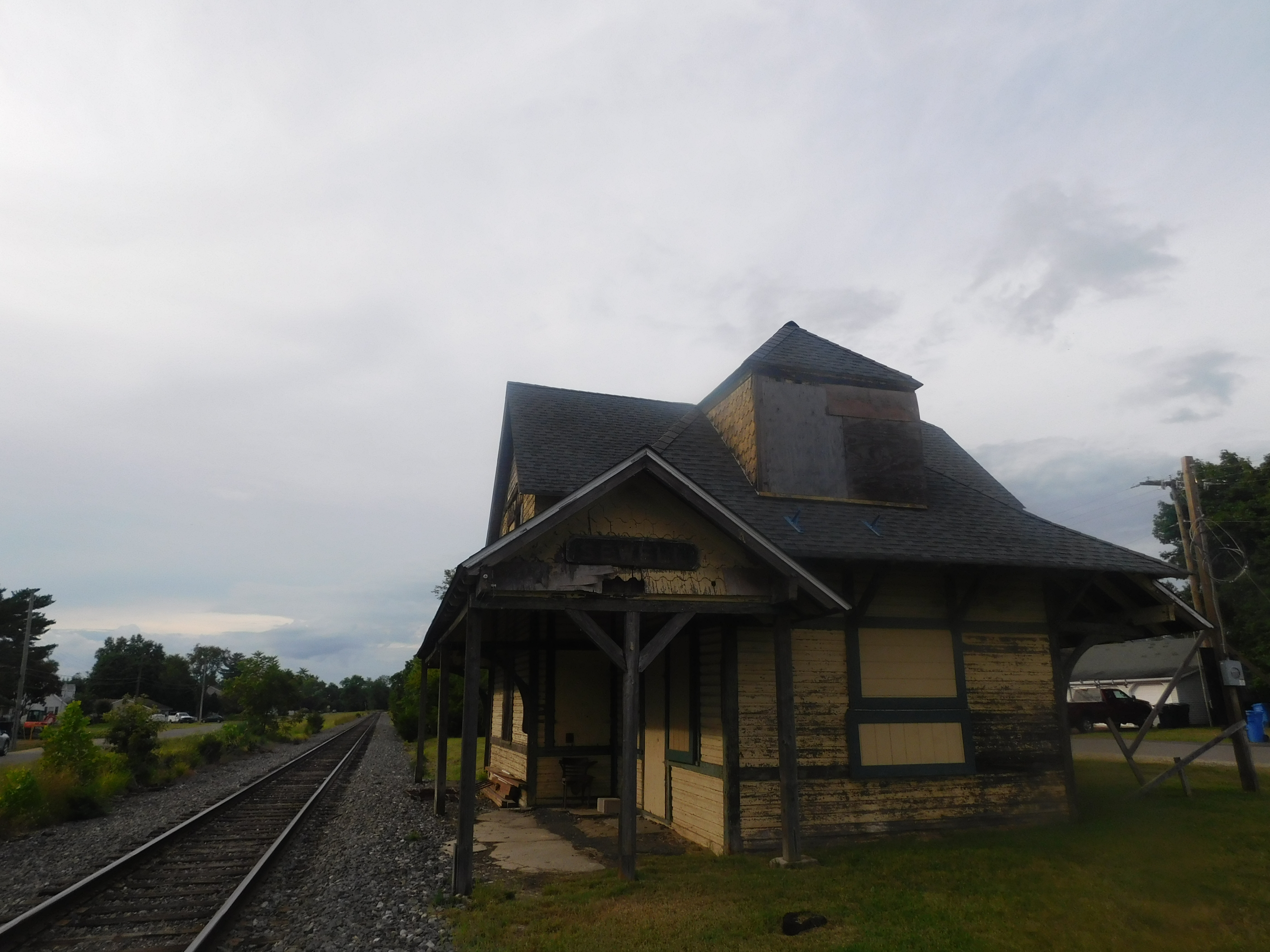
- The former station at Sewell in August 2022.

General information
- Location: Atlantic Avenue at Center Street; Sewell, New Jersey
- Coordinates: 39°45′59″N 75°08′40″W
- Platforms: 1
- Tracks: 1

History
- Opened: 1861
- Closed: February 5, 1971
- Rebuilt: 1888

Former services
Preceding station	Pennsylvania-Reading Seashore Lines	Following station
Wenonah toward Camden	WJ&S Camden – Millville	Pitman toward Millville
Location

Sewell is a defunct commuter railroad station in the Sewell section of Mantua Township, New Jersey, Gloucester County, New Jersey, U.S.

Service began in 1861, provided by the West Jersey Railroad, which later became the West Jersey Seashore Lines, and Pennsylvania-Reading Seashore Line branch between Millville and Camden. Passenger service was discontinued February 5, 1971. The line was subsumed by Conrail. Freight service operates along Conrail's South Jersey/Philadelphia Shared Assets Operations Vineland Secondary.

The community of Sewell was called originally called Barnsboro Station for the stop of the stagecoach line to Barnsboro (to Barnsboro Hotel, for example) and to Hurffville. The area was a summer resort for visitors on route to the Pitman Grove Methodist summer camp meeting. The name remained until the current station house was built. The community of Sewell, and subsequently the station, was named for General William Joyce Sewell (1835–1901), president of the West Jersey & Seashore and the Philadelphia & Camden Ferry Company.

The station house was built in 1888 by the West Jersey Railroad. It was purchased in 2006 by local residents who intended to preserve and possibly open ice cream shop, which did not materialize.

The site nearby the former station is a proposed stop of the Glassboro–Camden Line, a hybrid rail/light rail initiative to reintroduce rail service to the region using diesel multiple units (DMUs).

== See also ==
- Glassboro station
- Westville station
- Woodbury station
