= Westville station =

Former railway station in New Jersey, United States

Westville
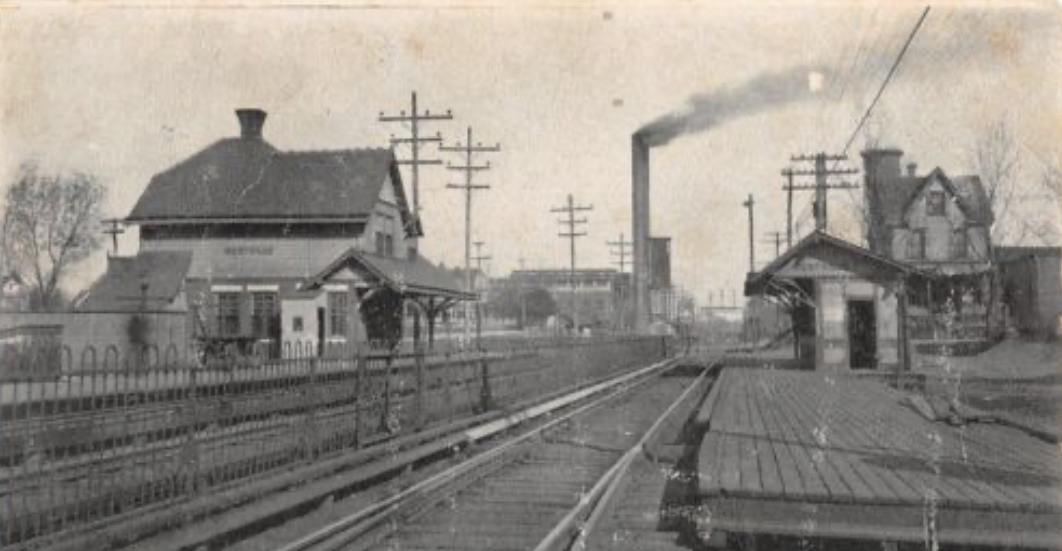
- 1907 postcard view of Westville station

General information
- Location: Station Avenue at Pine Street; Westville, New Jersey
- Coordinates: 39.869360°N 75.129419°W

History
- Opened: April 14, 1857
- Closed: February 5, 1971

Key dates
- 1947: Station depot razed

Former services
Preceding station	Pennsylvania-Reading Seashore Lines	Following station
Brooklawn toward Camden	WJ&S Camden – Millville	South Westville toward Millville
Location

Westville is a defunct commuter railroad station in the borough of Westville, Gloucester County, New Jersey. The station served trains on the former Pennsylvania-Reading Seashore Line branch between Millville and Camden. Westville station contained two side platforms located next to U.S. Route 130 and Station Avenue. The next station to the north (towards Camden) was Brooklawn, while South Westville served as the next station to the south (toward Millville).

Service in Westville began on April 14, 1857 with the opening of the West Jersey Railroad between Camden and Woodbury. Service ended with the discontinuation of trains between Glassboro and Millville with Camden on February 5, 1971. The site of the former station is a proposed stop of the Glassboro–Camden Line, a light rail initiative to bring service back between the two municipalities.

== History ==
The station stop was part of Camden and Woodbury Railroad, which began 1837–1838, but ran irregularly and was later abandoned.

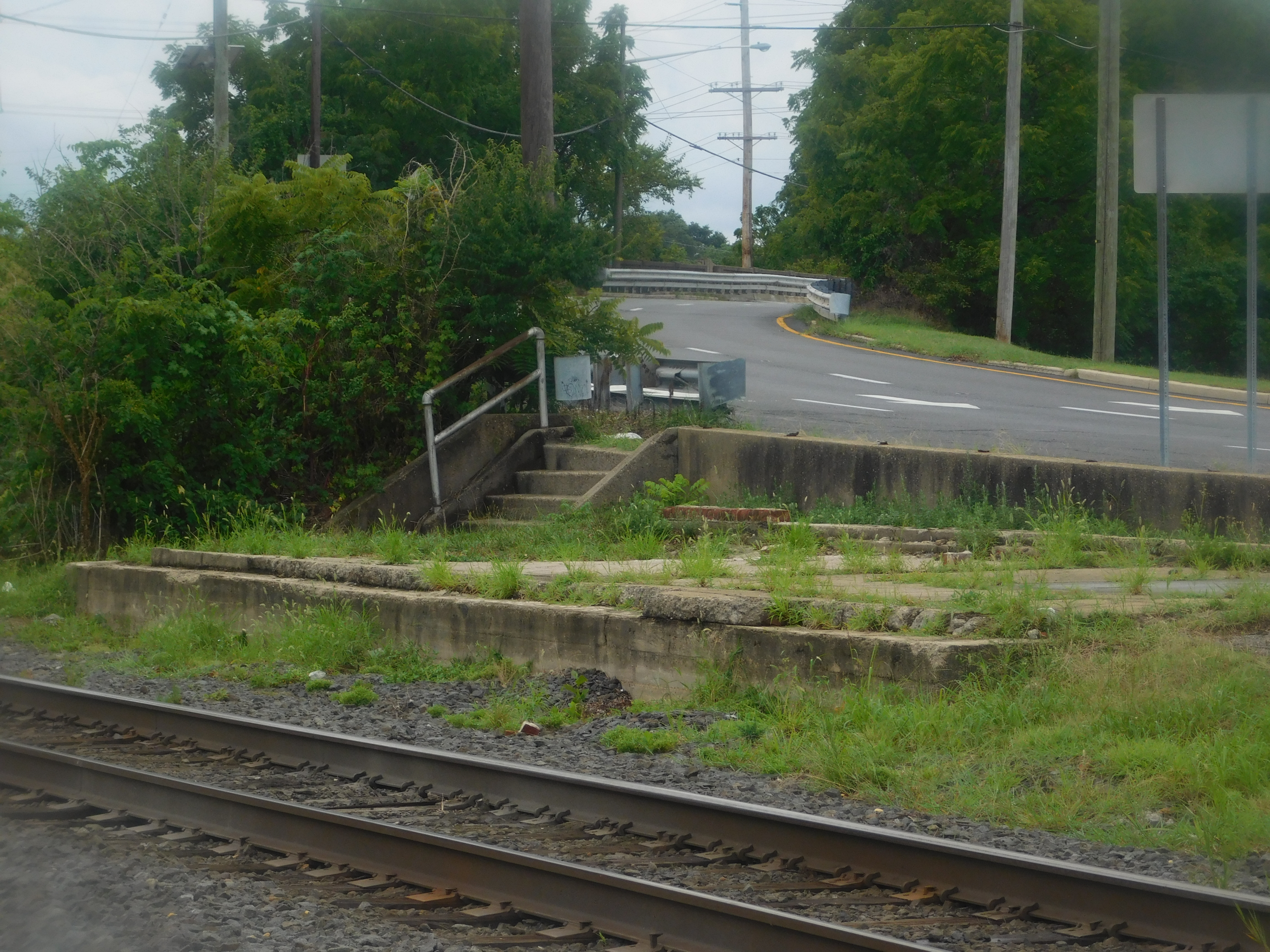
Westville station site in August 2022

The West Jersey Railroad (WJ) was granted its charter by the state of New Jersey on February 5, 1853, to build a line from Camden to Cape May. and the directors of the company met on July 15, 1853, to select the route on which they would build. The line was built in stages with the backing of the Camden and Amboy from Camden to Glassboro. The first 8.2 miles (13.2 km) of the line using the right-of-way built by the Camden and Woodbury Railroad opened on April 14, 1857 from Camden–Woodbury.

Railroad service increased and through acquisitions the line became part of Pennsylvania-Reading Seashore Lines, which was electrified until September 24, 1949 and replaced by diesel service. (The power house on River Drive Avenue in Westville was the last remnant of the electrified railroad.) The PRSL approved demolition and replacement of Westville station on March 3, 1947, to accommodate widening of U.S. Route 130 and State Route 45.

Penn Central Railroad discontinue passenger service through Westville ended on February 5, 1971 with the elimination of trains to Millville and Glassboro.

== Future ==
Crown Point Road

General information
- Location: Station Avenue at Pine Street; Westville, New Jersey
- System: Light rail
- Owner: NJ Transit
- Line: Glassboro–Camden Line
- Platforms: 1
- Tracks: 2

Proposed services
Preceding station	NJ Transit	Following station
Gloucester City toward Walter Rand Transportation Center	Glassboro–Camden Line	Red Bank Avenue toward Glassboro
Location

Crown Point Road is a planned station of the proposed Glassboro–Camden Line light rail system, to be located along the Vineland Secondary right-of way. It will be located between Station Avenue and Broadway at the Westville station site just east of U.S. Route 130 (known as Crown Point Avenue). Renderings show Crown Point Road station being a single island platform station, with a track on each side.

== See also ==
- Glassboro station
- Sewell station
- Woodbury station

== Bibliography ==
- Wilson, William Bender (1899). History of the Pennsylvania Railroad Company With Plan of Organization, Portraits of Officials and Biographical Sketches · Volume 1. Philadelphia, Pennsylvania: Henry T. Coates & Company.
