= Beach Bridge =

- Coordinates: 39°21′51″N 74°26′43″W
- Carries: 2 railroad tracks of the Atlantic City Line
- Crosses: Beach Thorofare (Intracoastal Waterway)
- Locale: Atlantic City, New Jersey
- Owner: NJ Transit Rail Operations
- Maintained by: NJ Transit Rail Operations

Characteristics
- Design: Swing bridge
- Clearance below: 35 feet (11 m)

History
- Opened: 1922

Location
- Interactive map of Beach Bridge

The Beach Bridge, also known as the Beach Thorofare Bridge, is a railroad swing bridge over the Beach Thorofare, part of the Intracoastal Waterway in Atlantic City, New Jersey, United States. The bridge carries two tracks of NJ Transit's Atlantic City Line, and connects mainland New Jersey with Absecon Island.

The bridge is located 68.9 miles (110.9 km) north of the Delaware Bay along the Intracoastal Waterway. Built in 1922, the swing bridge was rehabilitated in 1988 and 2004. Operation of bridge openings for maritime traffic is provided by the Title 33 of the Code of Federal Regulations.

An earlier bridge at the location had been the site of the 1906 Atlantic City train wreck.

== See also ==
- West Jersey and Seashore Railroad
- Atlantic City Railroad
- NJT movable bridges
