= Atlantic County Bikeway =

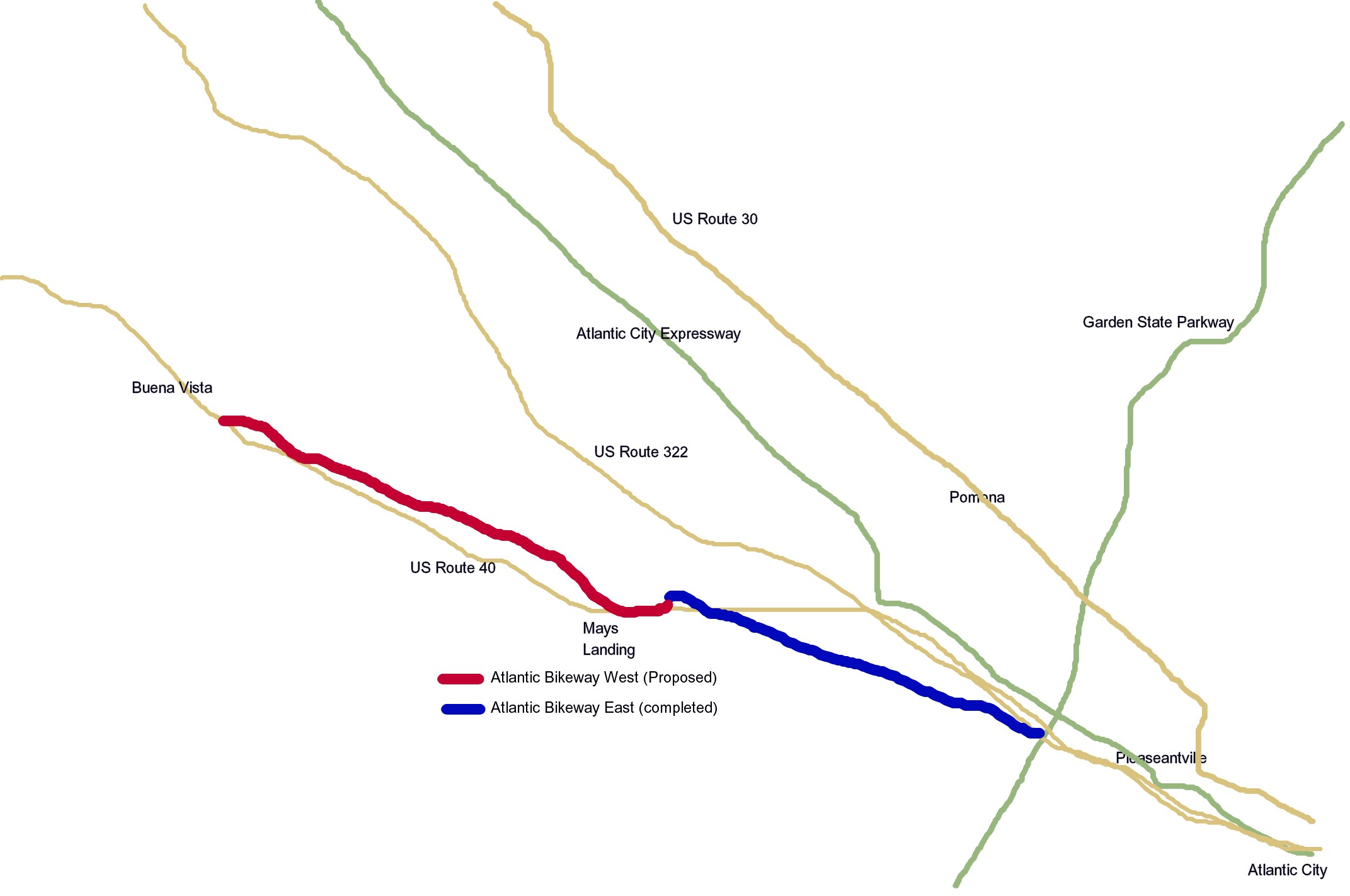
Atlantic County Bikeway.

The Atlantic County Bikeway is a rail trail in Atlantic County, New Jersey.

It occupies a 7.56-mile (12.17 km) abandoned rail corridor of the West Jersey and Atlantic Railroad later the Pennsylvania-Reading Seashore Lines in Atlantic County that extends from The Shore Mall in Egg Harbor Township near Garden State Parkway exit 36 to the Atlantic County Institute of Technology in Hamilton Township.

The trail is 10-foot (3.0 m) wide with 2-foot (0.61 m) shoulders, and an asphalt surface. The bikeway has three trailhead parking areas, located at the Shore Mall, the Atlantic County Institute of Technology high school and at English Creek Avenue. The bikeway was funded by the Atlantic County Open Space Trust Fund ($463,000) and a Federal Highway (ISTEA) grant ($541,000). The bikeway officially opened May 8, 2003.

Plans call for extending the bikeway to the Cumberland County Line, this section is referred to as bikeway west, and would run between Gaskill Park in Mays Landing and an area near the Buena Vista Campground near Routes 54 and 40 in Buena Vista.

It has been proposed to link the Atlantic County Bikeway with other south Jersey abandoned rail lines to extend the trail network all the way to Vineland.
