= South Camden Trust Company =

- U.S. National Register of Historic Places
- U.S. Historic district – Contributing property
- New Jersey Register of Historic Places
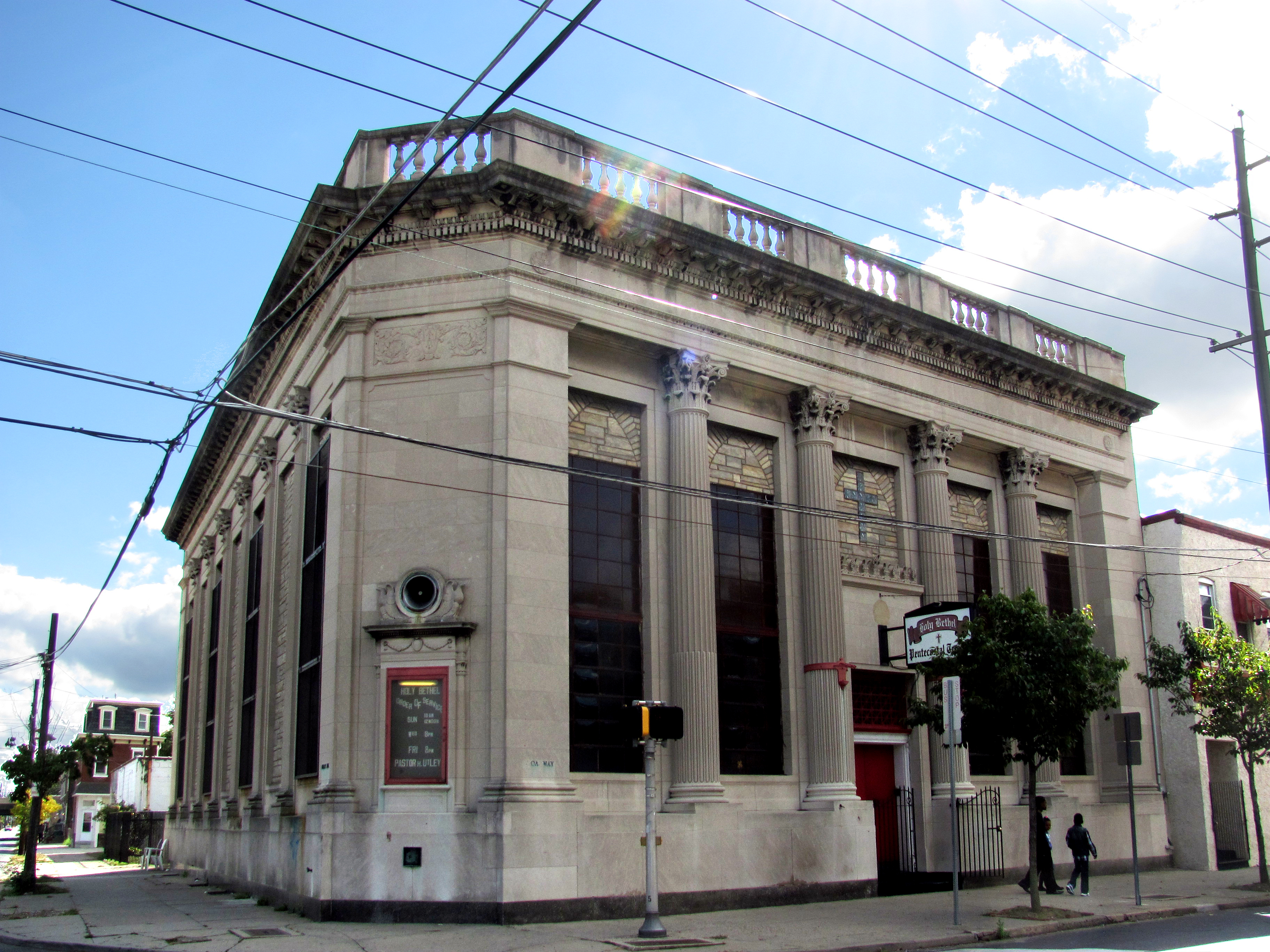
- South Camden Trust Company

- Location within New Jersey
- Location: Broadway at Ferry Street; Camden, New Jersey
- Coordinates: 39.921979°N 75.119570°W
- Architect: Lackey and Hettel
- NRHP reference No.: 90001255
- NJRHP No.: 926

Significant dates
- Added to NRHP: August 24, 1990
- Designated NJRHP: January 1, 1990

The South Camden Trust Company building is located within the South Camden area of Camden, New Jersey and was listed on the state and federal registers of historic places in 1990. Built in the 1920s, it has long functioned as a church.

== See also ==
- National Register of Historic Places listings in Camden County, New Jersey
