= 1896 Atlantic City rail crash =

1896 railroad accident in New Jersey

Coordinates: 39.3640°N 74.4474°W

Details
- Date: July 30, 1896; 6:30 pm
- Location: Atlantic City, New Jersey
- Country: United States
- Line: West Jersey Railroad
- Operator: Reading Company
- Incident type: Collision
- Cause: Engineer error

Statistics
- Deaths: 50
- Injured: Approx 60

The 1896 Atlantic City rail crash occurred just after 6:30 p.m. on July 30, 1896, at a crossing west of Atlantic City, New Jersey. It crushed five loaded passenger coaches, killed 50 people, and seriously injured about 60.

== Accident ==
In 1896, the tracks of the West Jersey Railroad leaving Atlantic City were parallel to those of the Camden and Atlantic Railroad until they crossed a drawbridge, when they turned south to cross the tracks of the Reading Railroad at an oblique angle.

On July 30, a five-car West Jersey train left Atlantic City bearing a special excursion of members of the Improved Order of Red Men and their friends from Bridgeton and Salem, New Jersey. As the train neared the Reading crossing, engineer John Greiner saw another train swiftly approaching. It was a Reading express train that had departed Philadelphia at 5:40 p.m. But the signals were open for Greiner to proceed on his way, so he continued.

Greiner's locomotive had just cleared the crossing when the Reading locomotive struck the first car of the West Jersey train. The impact threw the car far off the track in a nearby ditch, submerging it completely. The second car of the West Jersey train was also carried into the ditch, and third and fourth cars telescoped.

The engine of the Reading train was thrown to the other side of the track, killing the engineer and fatally injuring the fireman. The first coach was thrown from the track and many of its occupants were killed or injured.

A few minutes after the collision, the boiler of the Reading locomotive exploded, scalding several people to death and casting boiling spray over many of the injured passengers.

== Emergency response ==
As soon as the news reached Atlantic City it spread rapidly, and thousands of people came to the scene. The road leading to the collision was a constant scene of hackney carriages, omnibuses, bicycles, and all kinds of vehicles, while thousands of pedestrians hurried along the path to render what assistance they could or to satisfy their curiosity.

After darkness, the work of rescuing the injured and recovering the bodies of the dead was performed by the glare of huge bonfires. As onlookers watched through the night, the mangled and burned bodies of the dead were carried from the wreckage that trapped them and laid side by side on the gravel bank near the track, with no covering other than the few newspapers gathered from the passengers. The wounded were gathered together quickly and carried by train and wagon to the Atlantic City Hospital, where six of them died soon after their arrival. Two others died within a day, with 42 people having been killed at the collision scene.

The old Excursion House at the foot of Mississippi Avenue was converted into a morgue, and the dead were taken there.

During the first night after the crash, the streets in the vicinity of the Excursion House and the City Hospital, as well as the road leading to the scene of the accident, were packed with people anxious to learn the latest news.

The Bridgeton and Salem excursionists who escaped injury were brought back to Atlantic City and sent home on a special train several hours later in the evening.

James W. Hoyt, Secretary of the New Jersey Department of Public Safety, immediately upon learning of the extent of the accident, telegraphed for the Philadelphia Medical Emergency Corps, fifteen of whom responded, and hurried to Atlantic City on a special train that left Philadelphia at 10:45 pm. These surgeons materially aided Atlantic City's volunteer corps, which was composed of almost every physician then living in the city.

Many of the injured were taken to hotels, as the city hospitals soon became overcrowded. About thirty of the wounded had their injuries dressed and were able to proceed on their way.

The Reading engineer Edward Farr had died on the job and was found with one hand on the throttle and the other on the brake. When his wife was informed of the accident and her husband's death, she was unable to withstand the shock and fell to the floor dead.

== Inquest ==
County Coroner William McLaughlin, immediately upon hearing of the accident, went to the scene. He went directly into the block tower and questioned operator George F. Hauser. Hauser told him that he thought the excursion train had time to cross the tracks of the Reading before the express got there and he set the "clear" signal for the West Jersey train. (The signalling system worked as follows: the interlocking block system was used. There were three poles with semaphores controlled by the tower on the reading tracks and two on the West Jersey. The pole furthest from the tower on the Reading tracks was distant about 2,000 yards. The other two were much closer. When the operator set the "clear" signal on the Pennsylvania track, this would automatically set the "danger" signal on the Reading track, and vice versa.)

Before Hauser could make a further explanation to the coroner he received an order from the railroad officials not to say anything. He obeyed. Pending an investigation, Hauser was arrested by the coroner, but was released on $500 bond. A jury was impanelled the next day.

Testimony on August 4 seemed to implicate the dead Reading Railroad express engineer, Edward Farr. His action in running at a speed of forty-five miles an hour past a danger signal seemed inexplicable to those present at the inquest. His reputation was that of an experienced engineer and a man of exceptionally good moral character, and not of a reckless or careless disposition. Only two weeks previous to the accident his train was signaled to stop at that very crossing, and he obeyed promptly.

The coroner's jury returned verdicts on August 7. Six jurors merely stated the manner of the passengers' deaths. Three found that "Engineer Edward D. Farr of the Atlantic City Railroad failed for have his engine under proper control on approaching [the] crossing, and that Tower Man George F. Hauser, in giving the excursion train of the West Jersey Railroad the right of way over a fast express used bad judgment... [and] that Engineer John Greiner of said excursion train erred in not exercising greater care on crossing ahead of said fast express." Three others found that "the cause of the collision was the failure of Edward Farr, engineer of Train No. 23, to give heed in time to the semaphore signals and crossing under the rules...the tower man, George F. Hauser, may have used poor judgment in his estimate of the distance away of the Atlantic City Railroad train when he gave the white boards to the West Jersey and Seashore Excursion Train No. 700."

== Bibliography ==
- "Collision between Trains at Atlantic City", The New York Times, July 31, 1896, p. 1.
- "The Coroner at Work.", The New York Times, August 1, 1896, p. 2.
