= Penns Grove Secondary =

- Map

Overview
- Status: Active
- Owner: CSAO
- Locale: South Jersey
- Connecting lines: Salem Secondary; Vineland Secondary

Service
- Type: Freight rail
- System: CSAO
- Operator(s): CSX, NS, CSAO

Technical
- Number of tracks: 1
- Track gauge: 4 ft 8 1/2 in (1,435 mm) standard gauge

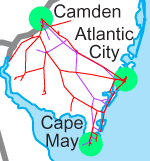
Once part of West Jersey and Seashore Railroad, Penns Grove Secondary parallels the Delaware River

Penns Grove Secondary is a rail freight line in the Philadelphia metropolitan area in the southwestern part of New Jersey. Part of Conrail's South Jersey/Philadelphia Shared Assets it runs for approximately 20 miles (32 km) between its southern terminus at Penns Grove and Woodbury at the north where it joins the Vineland Secondary about 8.5 miles (13.7 km) south of Pavonia Yard in Camden. At its southern end the Deepwater Point Running Track continues another 3.7 miles (6 km) through Carneys Point to Deepwater.

== Route ==
Located within Gloucester County and Salem County, the Penns Grove Secondary serves industries and distribution facilities in the corridor along the east bank of the Delaware River and with spur lines to Pureland Industrial Complex and maritime facilities, including the Port of Paulsboro, and the Paulsboro refinery where rail interchange is provided by SMS Rail Lines.

At the north, the line begins in Woodbury at a junction with the Salem Secondary and the Vineland Secondary. It then passes through Thorofare, West Deptford Township, Paulsboro, Gibbstown, Repaupo, Bridgeport, Pedricktown, and Penns Grove. For much of its length it travels parallel to US Route 130 and New Jersey Route 44. It bridges Mantua Creek, Repaupo Creek, White Sluice Race, Starrs Ditch, Raccoon Creek, and Oldmans Creek. Some of the bridges have been automated.

South of Penns Grove, the Deepwater Point Industrial Track continues through Carneys Point to a DuPont industrial complex known as the Chamber Works at Deepwater in the vicinity of the vehicular Delaware Memorial Bridge.

== History ==
The Delaware Shore Railroad was incorporated on February 20, 1873 to build a line from Woodbury to Penns Grove. The line was opened in July 1876, but declared bankruptcy in January 1879 and reincorporated as the Delaware River Railroad. On April 30, 1900, the WJ&S acquired the DRR. On May 4, 1896 the Pennsylvania Railroad (PRR) consolidated all its railroads and several smaller properties in southern New Jersey into the West Jersey and Seashore Railroad (WJ&S). Passenger service on the Penns Grove Branch ended July 8, 1950.

== Upgrades ==
=== Port of Paulsboro ===
A 2010 New Jersey Department of Transportation report anticipated increased freight activity in South Jersey. New infrastructure at the Port of Paulsboro includes the construction of a rail crossing, turnouts, and 11,000 feet (3,400 m) of track with a link to the Penns Grove Secondary and a balloon loop for dockside accessibility. It is expected to cost $3.2 million and be completed by 2014. Partial federal funding for this work was obtained in 2011 by South Jersey Port Corporation, Conrail, and Salem County by leveraging $117.65 million of infrastructure funding for the marine terminal and other South Jersey projects.

=== Jefferson Street Bridge ===
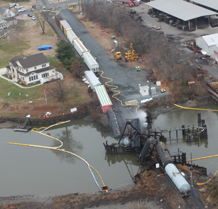
The derailment of coal cars over Mantua Creek in 2009

The Jefferson Street Bridge, or the Paulsboro Draw, is a railroad movable bridge over Mantua Creek 1.3 miles (2.1 km) upstream from its mouth. The 160-foot (49 m) "A-Frame", shear pole, swing bridge was originally constructed in 1917 and rebuilt in 1940. Once part of Pennsylvania-Reading Seashore Lines (PRSL), it is now part of Conrail's Penns Grove Secondary. Originally manually opened, it was partially automated sometime between 2000 and 2003.

Buckling of the bridge caused a derailment of a coal train in 2009. More than 15 rail cars left the tracks, though none toppled. In November 2012, seven cars derailed while crossing the bridge. Of the four cars that fell into the creek, one was punctured, releasing 23,000 US gallons (87 m^{3}; 19,000 imp gal) of highly toxic vinyl chloride, which required an evacuation in the region and Paulsboro school lock-downs. Removal of derailed cars and environmental cleanup was handled by U.S. Coast Guard.

In March 2013, Conrail announced that the bridge would be replaced with an expected September 2014 operational date. Normally, between March 1 and November 30 the bridge is left in the open position for maritime traffic and closed when trains approach. It will remain locked in the closed position until the bridge is replaced. A 2014 court ruling allowed Conrail to demolish the structure. It was replaced with a vertical-lift bridge, which opened in March 2015. and is operated remotely.

Numerous lawsuits had been brought in the matter.

== See also ==
- Southern Railroad of New Jersey
- Chemical Coast
