= South Camden =

Populated place in Camden County, New Jersey, US

Coordinates: 39.921198°N 75.12243°W

- South Camden Historic District
- U.S. National Register of Historic Places
- U.S. Historic district
- New Jersey Register of Historic Places
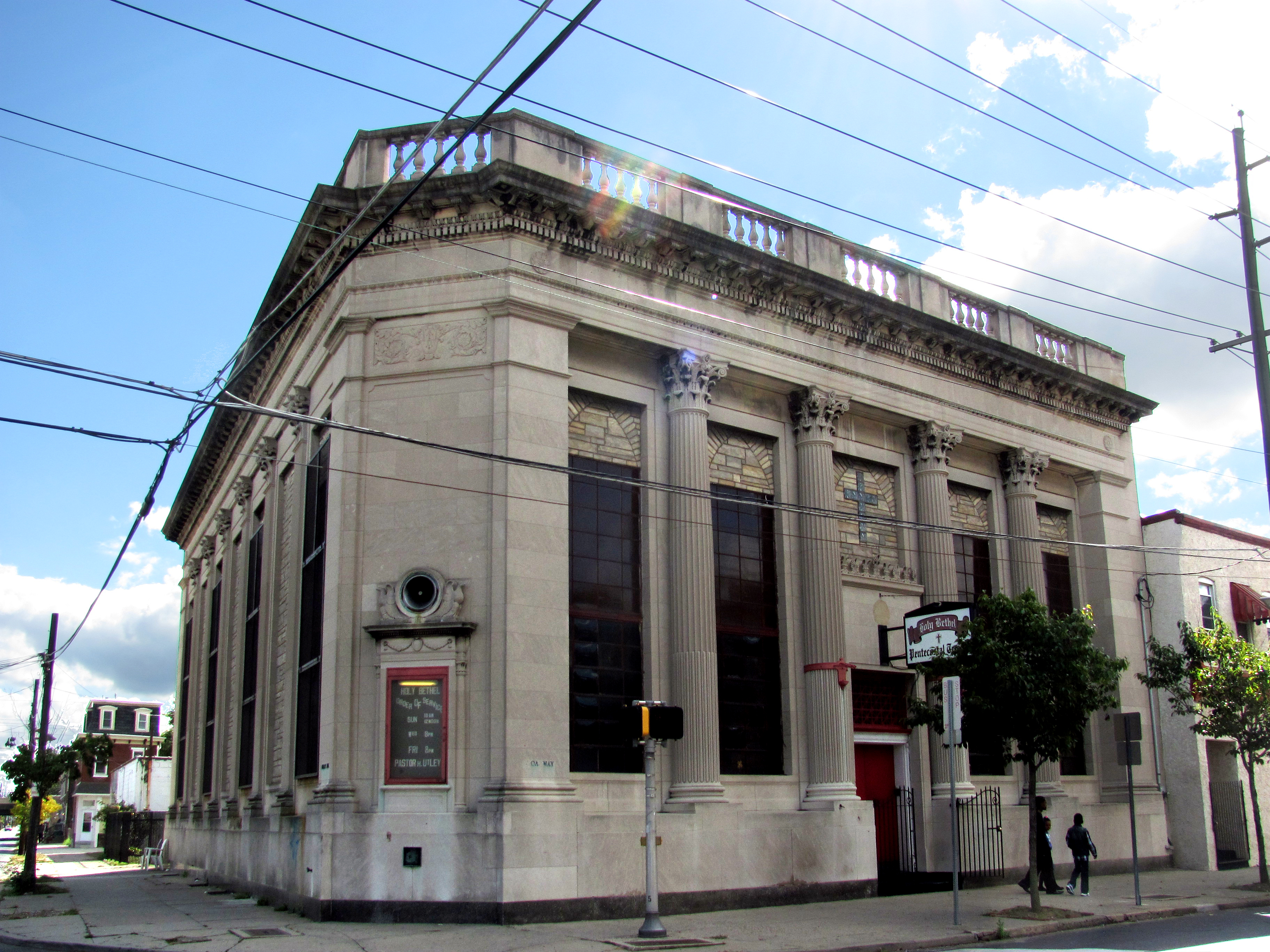
- South Camden Trust Company

- Location within New Jersey
- Location: Bounded by Jackson St, South Fourth St, Chelton Ave, and Railroad Ave; Camden, New Jersey
- Area: 686 acres (278 ha)
- Architectural style: Italianate, Classical Revival, Gothic
- NRHP reference No.: 90001453
- NJRHP No.: 925

Significant dates
- Added to NRHP: September 28, 1990
- Designated NJRHP: August 18, 1990

South Camden is a neighborhood in Camden, New Jersey. Located in the southern part of the city, below Central Waterfront and east of the Port of Camden on the Delaware River. Interstate 676 runs through the neighborhood.

The South Camden Historic District, bounded by Jackson St, South Fourth St, Chelton Ave, and Railroad Avenue, comprises 686 acres (278 ha) and 608 buildings, including the headquarters of the defunct South Camden Trust Company.

New York Shipbuilding Corporation, in the Port of Camden, was located many years along the waterfront on the west side of the neighborhood and once was its largest employer. The Camden Shipyard & Maritime Museum record its history.

In July 2014, the New Jersey Economic Development Authority awarded the Holtec International a $260 million tax incentive to expand operations at the site in the Port of Camden. The proposed Glassboro–Camden Line light rail system would stop in the neighbourhood at Ferry Avenue parallel and west of the North-South Freeway.

In September 2010 Waterfront South Theatre, home of the South Camden Theatre Company (SCTC), open as Camden's first live theatre space built in more than 100 years.

In August 2014, ground was broken on Phoenix Park, which will provide access to the waterfront on land previously used for industry.

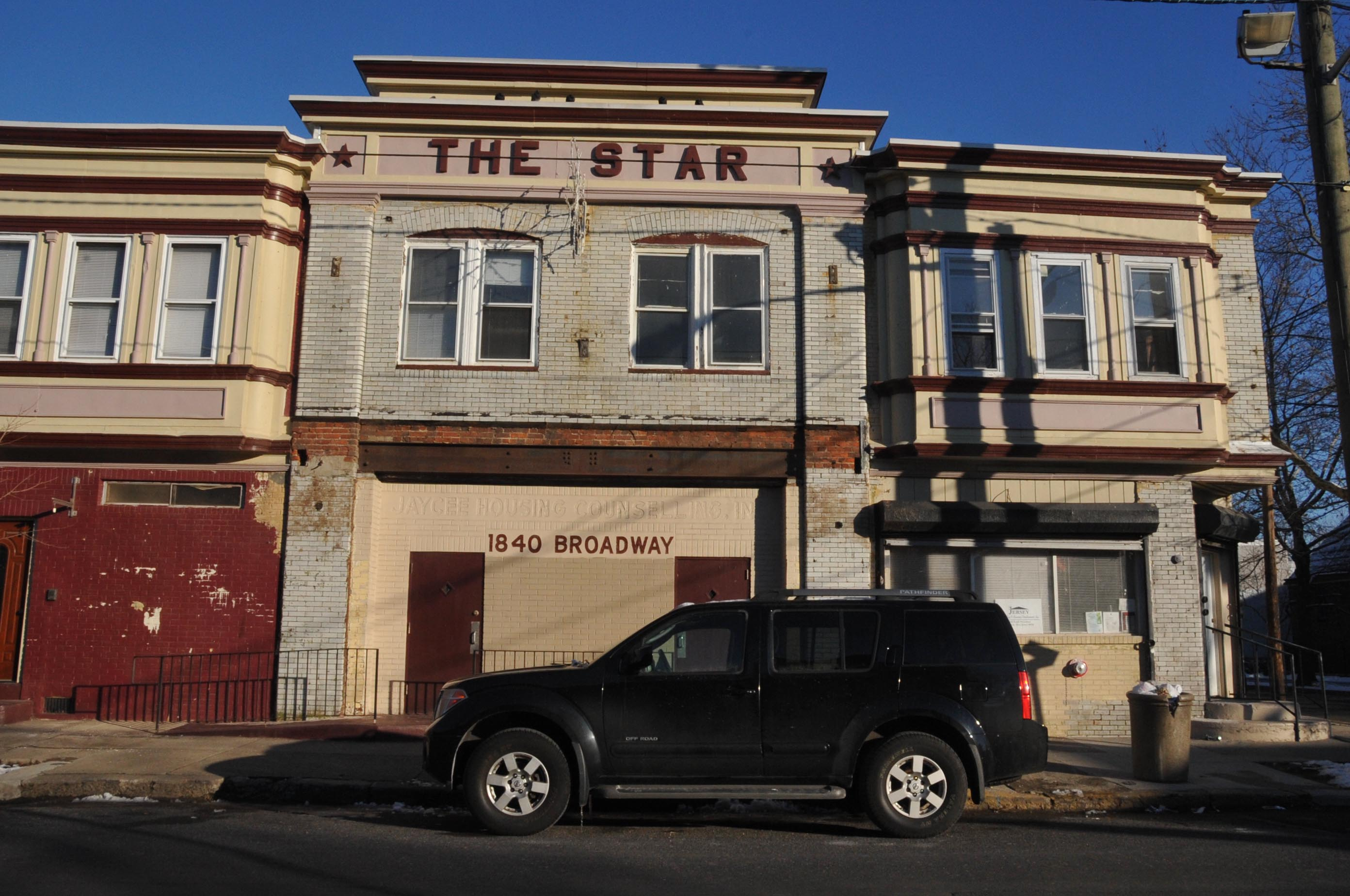
