= Vineland Secondary =

Overview
- Status: Active
- Owner: CSAO
- Locale: South Jersey
- Termini: Pavonia Yard, Camden; Millville
- Connecting lines: Salem Secondary; Penns Grove Secondary; Winchester and Western Railroad

Service
- Type: Freight rail
- System: CSAO
- Operator(s): CSX, NS, CSAO

History
- Commenced: 1853

Technical
- Line length: 37 miles (60 km)
- Number of tracks: 1
- Track gauge: 4 ft 8 1/2 in (1,435 mm) standard gauge

The Vineland Secondary is a rail line owned, operated and maintained by Conrail Shared Assets Operations for the use of CSX Transportation and Norfolk Southern Railway. It begins at Pavonia Yard in Camden and heads south, with a spur serving the Port of Camden. At Woodbury it junctions with the Salem Branch and Penns Grove Secondary, and continues to Millville, passing through namesake Vineland. At its southern end it connects to the OmniTRAX-owned Winchester and Western Railroad. The line is used exclusively for freight, however, the northern portion is planned to be used for the proposed Glassboro–Camden light rail line.

== History ==
The West Jersey Railroad (WJ) was granted its charter by the state on February 5, 1853 to build a line from Camden to Cape May. The line was built with the backing of the Camden and Amboy Railroad from Camden to Glassboro, with the first 8.2 miles of the line using the abandoned right-of-way (ROW) built by the Camden and Woodbury Railroad to Woodbury.

In 1896 the Pennsylvania Railroad (PRR) consolidated all its railroads and several smaller properties in southern New Jersey into the West Jersey and Seashore Railroad (WJ&S). In 1932, the PRR and Reading Company (RDG) merged their southern New Jersey railroad lines into one company, the Pennsylvania-Reading Seashore Lines (PRSL). The line was electrified between 1906–1949. In 1968 New York Central Railroad was merged into the PRR becoming Penn Central, which was bankrupt by 1970. The last passenger train ran on February 5, 1971.

The line came under the auspices of Conrail. Following the purchase and division of Conrail it was designated part of the South Jersey/Philadelphia Shared Assets Area, becoming known as the Vineland Secondary. In 1995, Conrail refurbished the Vineland Secondary and the connected Millville Running Track.

The original station house Glassboro station was restored in the 2010s.

In 2012, New Jersey Department of Transportation determined the ROW should be preserved and could expect expanded future use. In 2019, level crossings through Vineland were upgraded or eliminated.

== See also ==
- List of New Jersey railroads
- List of New Jersey railroad junctions
- Class III railroad
