= Glassboro station =

Inactive train station in Glassboro, New Jersey, U.S.

Glassboro
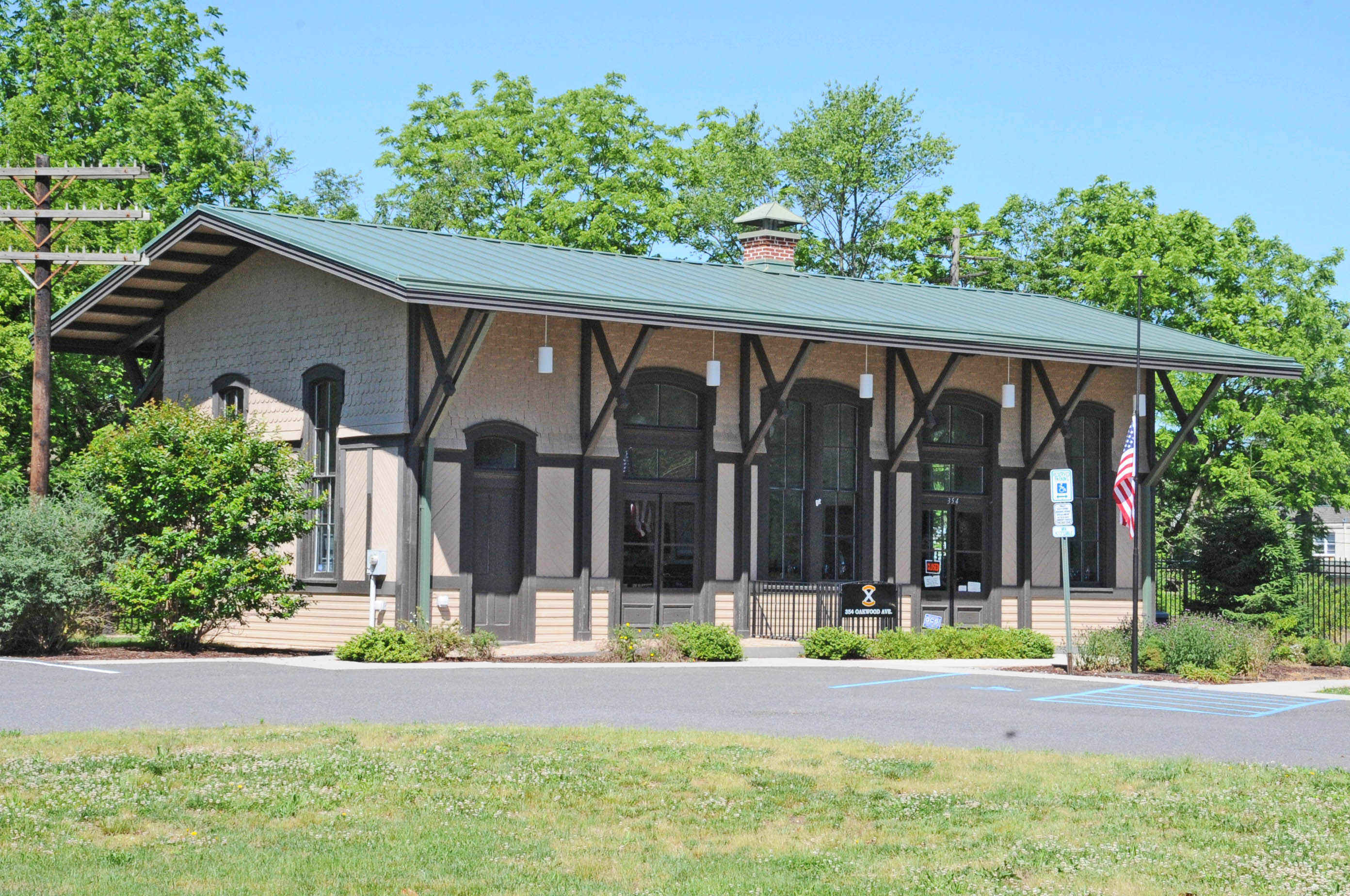

General information
- Location: 354 Oakwood Avenue, Glassboro, New Jersey
- Coordinates: 39.7047397°N 75.1219741°W

History
- Opened: 1863
- Closed: February 5, 1971

Former services
Preceding station	Pennsylvania-Reading Seashore Lines	Following station
Pitman toward Camden	WJ&S Camden – Millville	South Glassboro toward Millville
Terminus	WJ&S Bridgeton Branch	Aura toward Bridgeton
Preceding station	Pennsylvania Railroad	Following station
Pitman toward Camden	Cape May Division Before 1932	South Glassboro toward Cape May
- West Jersey Rail Road Glassboro Depot
- U.S. National Register of Historic Places
- Built by: West Jersey Rail Road
- NRHP reference No.: 100005179
- Added to NRHP: April 14, 2020
Location

Glassboro is an inactive train station in Glassboro, New Jersey which served passengers from 1863–1971. Its station house was restored c. 2015. It is located at the edge of the Rowan University campus. Listed as the West Jersey Rail Road Glassboro Depot, it was added to the National Register of Historic Places on April 14, 2020, for its significance in architecture and transportation.

A new station named Glassboro would be the southern terminus of the Glassboro–Camden Line, a light rail line thru Camden and Gloucester counties.

== History ==
The West Jersey Railroad (WJ) was granted its charter by the state on February 5, 1853, to build a line from Camden to Cape May. The line was built with the backing of the Camden and Amboy Railroad from Camden to Glassboro, with the first 8.2 miles (13.2 km) of the line using the abandoned ROW built by the Camden and Woodbury Railroad to Woodbury.

The 22-mile-long (35 km) Millville and Glassboro Railroad (M&G) was built by a group of Millville businessmen independently of the West Jersey Railroad. Chartered on March 9, 1859, and incorporated in March 1859, the M&G was completed and opened in October 1860.

In 1896 the Pennsylvania Railroad (PRR) consolidated all its railroads and several smaller properties in southern New Jersey into the West Jersey and Seashore Railroad (WJ&S). In 1932, the PRR and Reading Company (RDG) merged their southern New Jersey railroad lines into one company, the Pennsylvania-Reading Seashore Lines (PRSL). The line was electrified between 1906–1949. In 1968 New York Central Railroad was merged into the PRR becoming Penn Central, which was bankrupt by 1970. The last passenger train ran in 1971.

The line came under the auspices of Conrail. Following the purchase and division of Conrail it was designated part of the South Jersey/Philadelphia Shared Assets Area. Known as the Vineland Secondary it is owned, operated and maintained by Conrail for the exclusive benefit of CSX Transportation and Norfolk Southern Railway. The Vineland Secondary begins at Pavonia Yard in Camden and heads south. It has a spur serving the Port of Camden. It continues another 19 miles (30.58 km) to Millville.

== Restoration of station building ==
The station house was renovated in 2015. It is part of the Millville and Glassboro Railroad Historic District (ID#4153), recognized by the New Jersey' Office of Historic Preservation.

== Glassboro–Camden Line ==
A new station at Rowan University in the vicinity of the historic depot is the planned for the proposed Glassboro–Camden Line, an 18-mile (28.97 km) diesel multiple unit (DMU) light rail system. The terminal, also to be called Glassboro station, planned for Ellis Street, is one stop further at Main and High streets.

== See also ==
- Operating Passenger Railroad Stations Thematic Resource (New Jersey)
- National Register of Historic Places listings in Gloucester County, New Jersey
