= Pavonia Yard =

Coordinates: 39.951°N 75.091°W

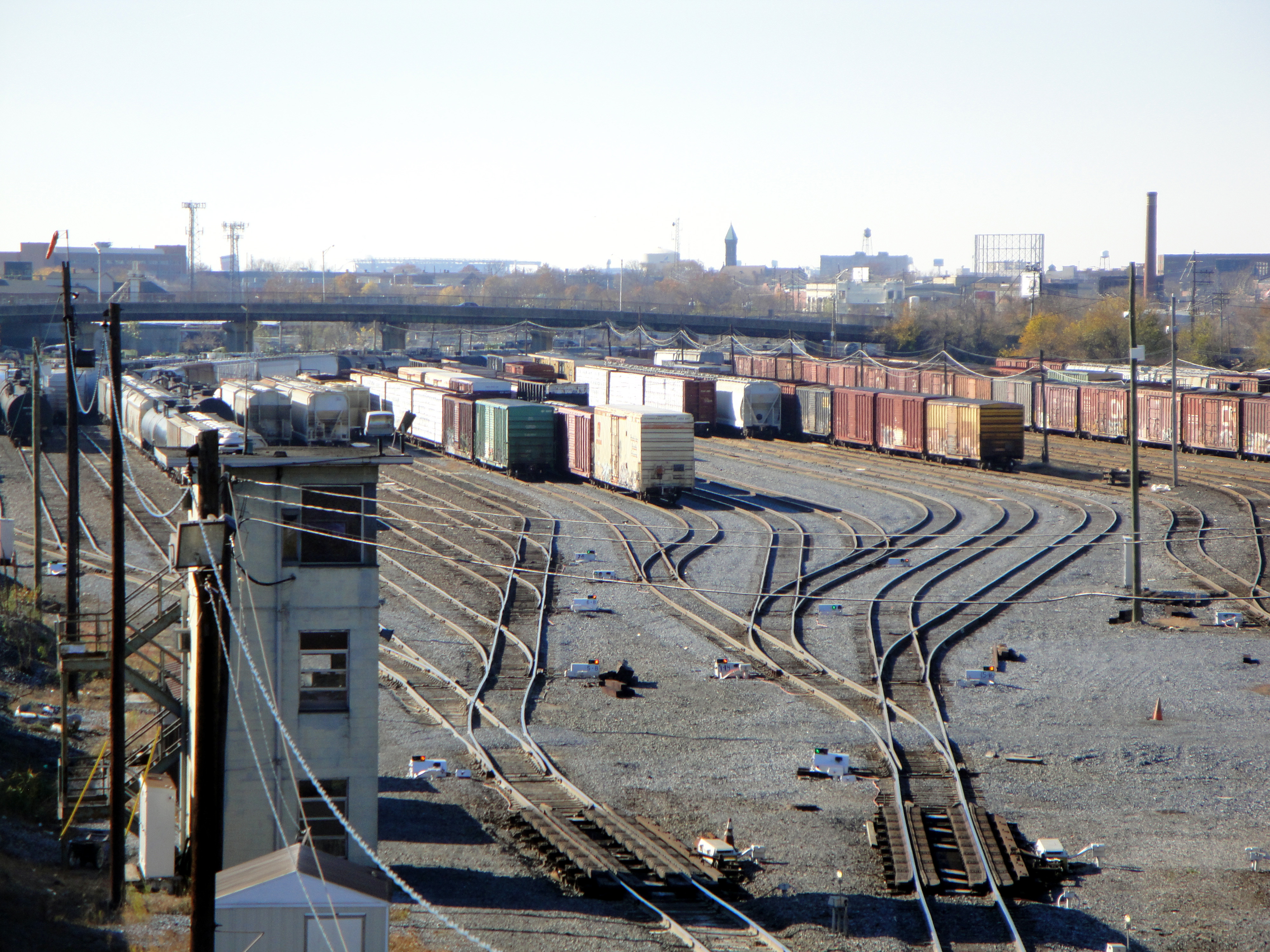
Classification bowl at Pavonia Yard. In the foreground is the hump control tower and two retarder tracks.

Pavonia Yard is a Conrail Shared Assets Operations (CSAO) rail yard in Camden, New Jersey.

The yard begins just north of where the Vineland Secondary tracks cross the Cooper River near the intersection of State and Federal Streets, and continues north until approximately 36th Street, ending near the 36th Street River Line station on the Bordentown Secondary.

== History ==
It was built by the Pennsylvania Railroad (PRR) and opened in 1888. The yard was used to interchange with the West Jersey and Seashore Railroad (WJ&S) during 1896 to 1932, and with the Pennsylvania-Reading Seashore Lines (P-RSL) during 1932 to 1976. Initially the PRR operated large locomotive and car repair shops at the yard. In later years the engine work was discontinued, but the car repair shops remained in operation through the late 1930s. The yard was rebuilt in the 1960s.

== Conrail ==
Pavonia Yard serves as CSAO's main classification yard for the Southern New Jersey area. It is a double-ended hump yard with a 32-track classification bowl. After the Conrail split of 1999, Pavonia handled 600 to 750 cars per day, though by 2009, that had dropped to 300 to 350 cars per day. This resulted in CSAO rebuilding the yard to remove the retarders and much of the hump.

== See also ==
- List of New Jersey railroads
- List of New Jersey railroad junctions
- List of rail yards

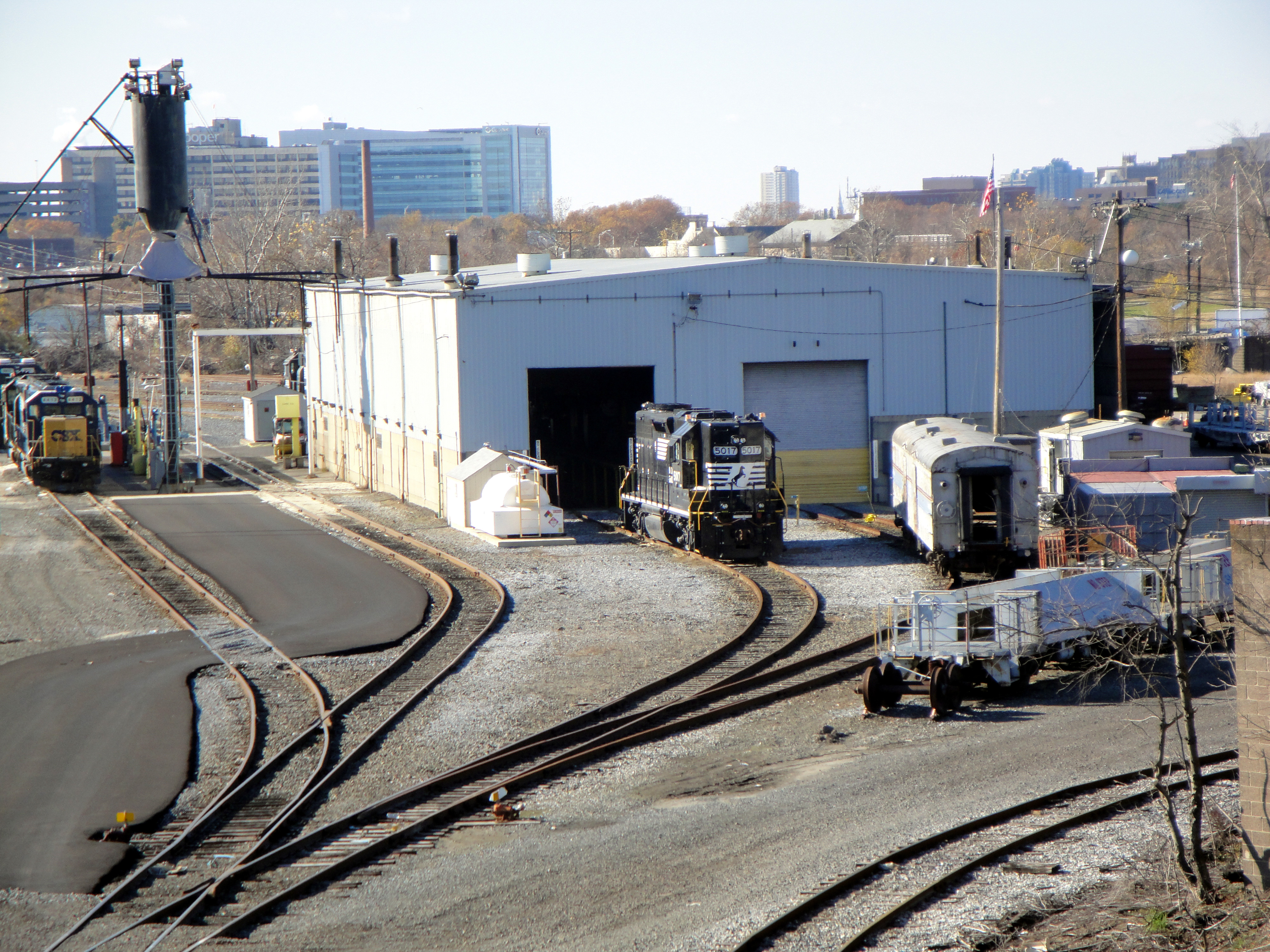
Engine house and diesel locomotive service area (left) at Pavonia Yard.
