= 1906 Atlantic City train wreck =

Rail accident in 1906

Coordinates: 39°21′52″N 74°26′44″W

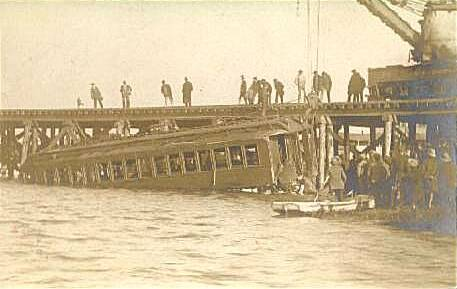
- Car 6704 being removed from the water

Details
- Date: October 28, 1906; 14.20
- Location: Atlantic City, New Jersey, U.S.
- Country: United States
- Line: West Jersey and Seashore Railroad
- Operator: Pennsylvania Railroad
- Incident type: Derailment
- Cause: Draw (swing) bridge locking failure

Statistics
- Trains: 1
- Passengers: 87
- Deaths: 53

The 1906 Atlantic City train wreck occurred in Atlantic City, New Jersey, on Sunday October 28, 1906, when a West Jersey and Seashore Railroad electric train fell off a draw (swing) bridge, drowning 53 people.

== Accident ==
The newly-constructed bridge crossed The Thoroughfare, a creek separating Atlantic City from the mainland. On Sunday, October 28, 1906, the bridge had been opened to allow a small vessel to pass.

At 2.20 p.m., the first eastbound train, which had left Camden an hour earlier, attempted to cross, but as it moved onto the bridge at a speed of 40 mph it derailed. After bumping along the ties (sleepers) for a few seconds the first two cars plunged 15 feet into the water. With doors shut and connecting doors closed, the passengers had very little chance to escape. The trailing car remained hanging from the bridge superstructure for a brief time before it slipped into the water. The brakeman traveling in this third car rushed to open the rear door as soon as the train left the rails and held it open to allow many passengers to escape, with only one or two escaping from the first two cars. Passengers broke windows in attempts to get free; several who escaped returned to rescue others. It was to the rear car that rescue efforts were soon directed, both from boats and from ropes let down from the bridge.

A crowd of thousands quickly gathered, the terminal being nearby. Fifty-three people were killed in the accident.

== Cause ==
The operation of the bridge had been tested after electrification of the line only one month before, and a westbound train had already crossed without incident after the opening of the drawbridge. To disengage, the bridge was raised slightly, but on that occasion, it had not returned to the correct level. The weight of the westbound train had depressed the bridge, so allowing it to pass, but the same had not happened for the eastbound.

The accident resulted in what is regarded as the first press release when public relations expert Ivy Lee, working with the Pennsylvania Railroad, parent company of the West Jersey and Seashore Railroad, convinced the company to present a statement to journalists at the scene of the accident. The New York Times printed the release word-for-word on October 30, 1906.

== See also ==
- Beach Bridge
- NJT movable bridges
