= Glassboro–Camden Line =

Planned hybrid rail service in southern New Jersey

Overview
- Locale: Camden and Gloucester counties, New Jersey, U.S.
- Termini: Walter Rand Transportation Center; Glassboro
- Stations: 14
- Website: glassborocamdenline.com

Service
- Type: Hybrid rail
- System: NJ Transit
- Services: 1

Technical
- Line length: 18 mi (29 km)
- Track gauge: 4 ft 8 1/2 in (1,435 mm) standard gauge

The Glassboro–Camden Line (GCL) is a planned 18-mile (29 km) hybrid rail service in southern New Jersey.

At the northern terminus, the Walter Rand Transportation Center in Camden, it will connect with the River Line with which its infrastructure and vehicles will be compatible, and paid transfers will be possible to the PATCO Speedline. The route will generally follow the right of way (ROW) of Conrail's South Jersey/Philadelphia Shared Assets Operations Vineland Secondary freight rail line, which continues beyond the light rail terminus in Glassboro. The project is part of a greater plan to expand public transportation in the Philadelphia metropolitan area.

== History ==
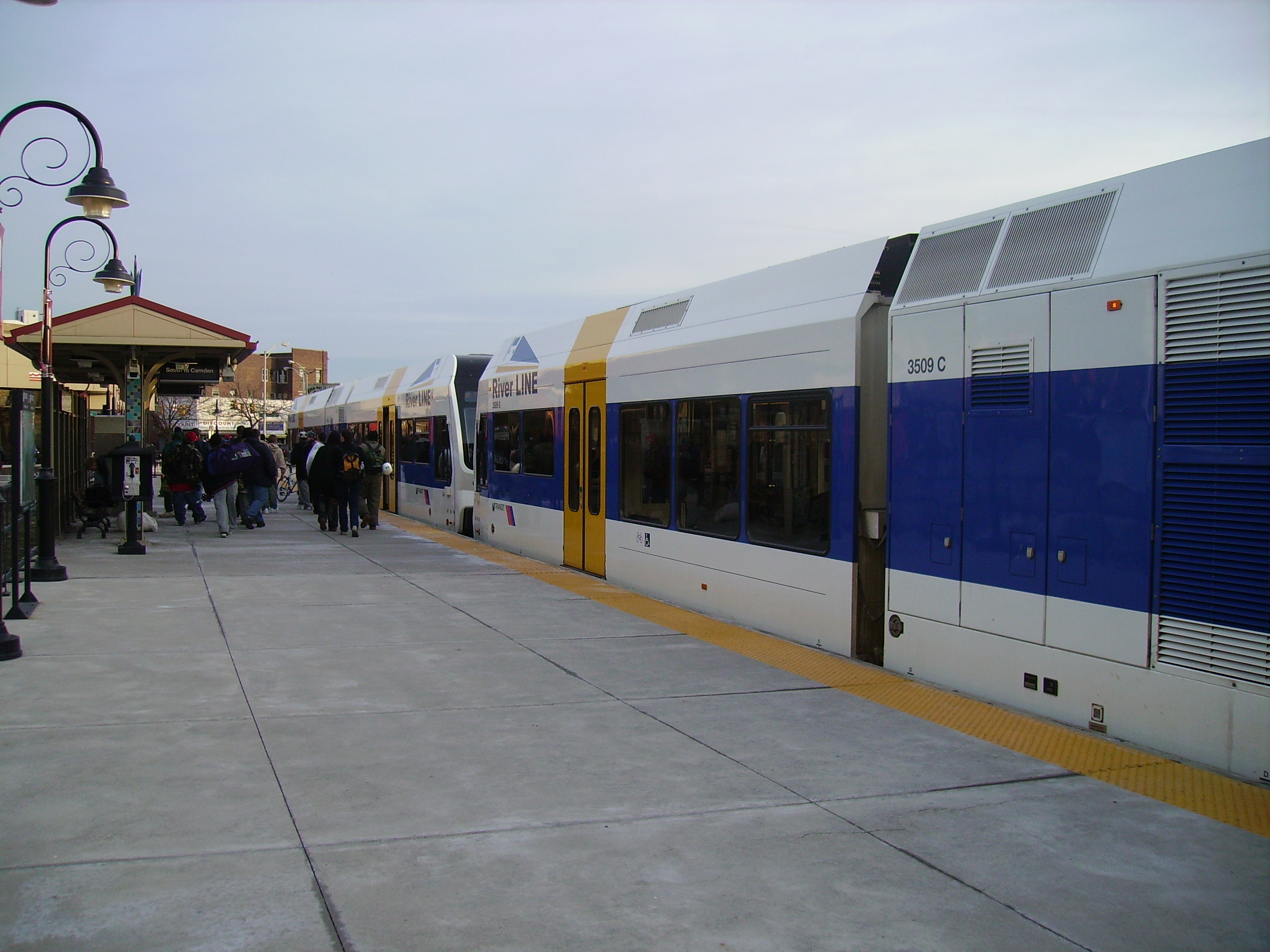
The Glassboro–Camden Line will use vehicles similar to those used currently in NJ Transit's River Line.

In the early 1990s, NJ Transit (NJT) commissioned a major investment study to examine mass transit options for the South Jersey region in Burlington, Camden, and Gloucester. A passenger rail connection from Camden to Glassboro was among the proposals in the report released in 1996.

In May 2009, New Jersey Governor Jon S. Corzine and the Delaware River Port Authority announced the project, which was expected to cost $1.8 billion and be completed in 2019. However, due to lack of funds, local opposition, and other setbacks, construction has yet to begin as of 2021.

An environmental impact report was completed and released in February 2021. In October 2022, the project entered the design phase and engineering phase, expected to take three years, with the project anticipated to be completed in 2028. In November 2023, residents in Mantua Township held a non-binding referendum on the proposed rail line, voting 68.77% against the proposal.

In August 2024, NJ Transit became the "agency of record" for the project.

=== Funding ===
In July 2012, NJT received $2.6 million in federal funding to advance the project.

In July 2014, the Federal Transit Administration said it would not proceed with a required environmental study because no owner or operator had been identified. While the Delaware River Port Authority (DRPA) was overseeing the $8.1 million environmental study, the agency had not agreed to build or run the line. NJT agreed to fund the study, but had also not committed to building or running the line. In August 2024, NJ Transit became the "agency of record" for the project.

As New Jersey raised its gas taxes in 2016, the line was targeted to receive funding for construction. Any advancement of the project is unlikely to take place until after 2025 according to the vice chairman of DRPA.

When the environmental report was released in February 2021, it was announced that the South Jersey Transportation Authority would be contributing $200 million to the project. This funding will cover preliminary engineering and design, project management, and professional services for the pre-construction phase of the light rail line.

== Route and stations ==
The Glassboro–Camden Line is located within Camden County and Gloucester County.

Within Camden, it will follow a newly constructed viaduct south from the Walter Rand Transportation Center to South Camden. It would then utilize the Conrail-owned Vineland Secondary right-of-way (ROW) to Glassboro.

As of 2021, plans call for 14 stations: three in Camden; one each in Gloucester City and Westville; two in Woodbury, one each in Woodbury Heights, Mantua, Sewell, Mantua/Pitman, and Pitman; and two stations in Glassboro. In a non-binding referendum, Wenonah citizens voted against allowing a station in town. The town council also passed such a resolution. Other towns have expressed concern over the route through them.

Municipality	Station name	Location	Notes
Camden	Walter Rand Transportation Center	Downtown Camden; 39°56′35″N 75°07′11″W	PATCO; River Line
Camden	Lanning Square	Cooper University Hospital; Lanning Square; 39°56′30″N 75°07′00″W	
Camden	South Camden	South Camden; 39°55′21″N 75°07′00″W	Park and ride
Gloucester City	Gloucester City	39°53′38″N 75°07′09″W	Park and ride
Westville	Crown Point Road	East of U.S. Route 130; 39°52′10″N 75°07′46″W	Park and ride
Woodbury	Red Bank Avenue	39°50′37″N 75°08′47″W	Park and ride
Woodbury	Woodbury	Cooper Street; 39°50′11″N 75°08′59″W	Park and ride
Woodbury Heights	Woodbury Heights		Park and ride
Mantua Township	Mantua	39°46′30″N 75°08′59″W	Park and ride
Mantua Township	Sewell	Sewell; 39°45′59″N 75°08′40″W	
Mantua Township	Mantua Pitman		Park and ride
Pitman	Pitman		
Glassboro	North Glassboro	Rowan University; 39°42′37″N 75°07′28″W	
Glassboro	Glassboro	39°42′03″N 75°06′40″W	Park and ride

== Regional transit plans ==
The Glassboro–Camden Line is part of a broader plan to expand a regional multimodal transportation network in Philadelphia metropolitan area metro area including service across the Delaware River to Philadelphia. Other elements of network would include additions and adjustments to PATCO Speedline and Atlantic City Line and the development of new system of bus rapid transit in New Jersey. The region is served by NJT buses 400–499.

The bus rapid transit component would be developed along the heavily traveled corridor comprising I-676, Route 42, and Route 55 The southern end of the system would be a newly constructed park and ride in Deptford on New Jersey Route 55 and an expanded one in Winslow Township with peak-hour buses running at 10–15 minute intervals. Travelling northwest, the two lines would converge to pass through downtown Camden, where transfers would be possible for other components of the network, including at the Walter Rand Transportation Center. They would then continue over the Benjamin Franklin Bridge, equipped with reversible or contra-flow lanes to a point near Philadelphia City Hall.

== See also ==
- Bus rapid transit in New Jersey
- Delaware Valley Regional Planning Commission
- Light rail in New Jersey
- Northern Branch Corridor Project
