= Railroad electrification in the United States =

Infrastructure for zero-emissions train propulsion

Railroad electrification in the United States began at the turn of the 20th century, with many private railroad companies seeking to electrify portions of their network. The introduction of electrification by various companies led to the development of multiple divergent electrification systems in different geographical areas, few of which were interconnected. Despite this divergence in method, most of these systems shared a small number of common reasons for electrification.

Mainline railroad electrification in the United States is quite rare in comparison to most European or East Asian rail networks, with less than 1% of mainline trackage in the country being electrified. Most of the systems discussed in this article are either no longer electrified, or are now part of the Northeast Corridor and Keystone Corridor systems used by Amtrak and several commuter rail lines. A few isolated systems, operated exclusively for hauling coal from mines to power plants, also retain their electrification. Most mass transit, streetcar, and interurban systems were electrified very early in their existence (many from the beginning) but are not within the scope of this article.

Opposition to electrification by the major Class I railroads for its cost and perceived lack of benefit forms a large part of the reason for its relative lack in the US. For example, the Association of American Railroads opposes electrification due to its high capital costs. Opponents of electrification also argue that since the entire United States railroad network contributes only 0.56% of the nation's greenhouse gas emissions, electrification would be of negligible benefit to the environment.

== Impetus for electrification ==
=== Laws banning steam locomotives (smoke abatement) ===
A number of municipalities passed laws in the early part of the 20th century forbidding steam locomotives from operating within city limits, after some bad accidents caused by the awful conditions of visibility in smoke and steam-filled tunnels and cuttings. The most prominent of these laws was for New York City in 1903 (effective 1908).

An extensive study was also undertaken in Chicago of the problems of smoke and the feasibility of electrification as a solution.

=== Long tunnels ===
Long, deep tunnels provided poor ventilation for steam locomotives and their crews. To combat this, bespoke solutions such as wearing oxygen masks or using cab-forward locomotives became necessary to avoid asphyxiation. These ventilation problems also limited the frequency of trains through these tunnels, as smoke needed to be cleared before the next train could pass. The Cascade Tunnel is a good example of where these problems prompted electrification. Also see the Milwaukee Road's Pacific Extension.

=== Mountains ===
The electric locomotive has many advantages in mountainous terrain, including better adhesion, greater power at low speeds, no requirements for fueling or watering, and regenerative braking. The under-construction California High-Speed Rail system, for example, will require electrification to achieve acceptable speeds through the Tehachapi Mountains.

=== Traffic density ===
Extremely high-traffic lines can readily recoup the high capital investment of electrification by the savings accrued during operation. The savings typically result from improved utilization of trains, and lower maintenance costs.

=== Short-distance commuter operations ===
Suburban commuter trains are an ideal subject for electrification since electric multiple units possess rapid acceleration, fast braking (sometimes regenerative braking), and the ability to change direction without running a locomotive around. It also reduces diesel locomotive emissions in relatively high-density areas.

=== Freight operations ===
Heavy freight trains are ideally suited to electric traction due to the greater pulling power of an electric locomotive.

== Overview of electrification in the U.S. ==
Electrification in the US reached its maximum of 3,100 miles (5,000 km) in the late 1930s.

By 1973, it was down to 1,778 route miles (2,861 km) (Class I railroads) with the top 3 being: Penn Central 829 miles (1,334 km), Milwaukee Road 658 miles (1,059 km), Long Island Rail Road 121 miles (195 km).

In 2013, the only electrified lines hauling freight by electricity were three short line coal haulers (mine to power plant) and one switching railroad in Iowa. The total electrified route length of these four railroads is 122 miles (196 km). As of 2025, only one of the three short line coal haulers, Deseret Power Railway, and Iowa Traction Railway still operate.

While some freight trains run on parts of the electrified Northeast Corridor and on part of the adjacent Keystone Corridor, these freight trains use diesel locomotives for traction. The total electrified route length of these two corridors is 559 miles (900 km). Diesel-powered freight runs similarly operate over the South Shore Line, and the San Diego Trolley and Salt Lake City TRAX light rail systems.

=== Current systems ===
System	Route length	Electrification	Notes
Amtrak Northeast Corridor	155 mi (249 km)	25 kV 60 Hz overhead line	New Haven to Boston: Part of Amtrak's 60 Hz traction power system; Includes CT Rail's Shore Line East
Amtrak Northeast Corridor	77 mi (124 km)	12.5 kV 60 Hz overhead line	New York City to New Haven: Part of Amtrak's 60 Hz traction power system
Amtrak Northeast Corridor	225 mi (362 km)	12 kV 25 Hz overhead line	Washington D.C. to New York City: Part of Amtrak's 25 Hz traction power system; New York Penn Station, and linked tunnels also have 750 V third rail power; Includes MARC's Penn Line
Philadelphia to Harrisburg Main Line	103 mi (166 km)	12 kV 25 Hz overhead line	Part of Amtrak's 25 Hz traction power system: Includes SEPTA's Center City Commuter Connection
SEPTA		12 kV 25 Hz overhead line	SEPTA's 25 Hz traction power system
Metro-North Railroad		750 V third rail	Includes: Harlem Line Grand Central Terminal to Southeast station; Hudson Line to Croton-Harmon station; New Haven Line to Pelham
Metro-North Railroad	49 mi (79 km)	12.5 kV 60 Hz overhead line	New Haven Line Mount Vernon to New Haven: Amtrak uses New Rochelle to New Haven as part of Northeast Corridor
Long Island Rail Road	~160 mi (260 km)	750 V third rail	Includes: Main Line to Ronkonkoma; Montauk Branch Jamaica – Babylon segment; Atlantic Branch; Port Washington Branch; Far Rockaway Branch; Long Beach Branch; Hempstead Branch; West Hempstead Branch; Oyster Bay Branch to East Williston; Port Jefferson Branch to Huntington
New Jersey Transit		12.5 kV 60 Hz overhead line	North Jersey Coast Line Linden to Matawan
New Jersey Transit		25 kV 60 Hz overhead line	Includes: Morristown Line Hoboken to Dover; Gladstone Branch; Montclair-Boonton Line Hoboken to Montclair State University; North Jersey Coast Line Matawan to Long Branch
Metra Electric District	~38.5 mi (62.0 km)	1,500 V overhead line	Shares approximately 14 route miles (23 km) with South Shore Line
South Shore Line	99 mi (159 km)	1,500 V overhead line	Former interurban, shares approximately 14 route miles (23 km) with Metra Electric District
RTD commuter rail	53 mi (85 km)	25 kV 60 Hz overhead line (FasTracks)	
Caltrain	51 mi (82 km)	25 kV 60 Hz overhead line (CalMod)	
Iowa Traction Railway	10 mi (16 km)	600 V overhead line	freight operator
Deseret Power Railroad	35 mi (56 km)	50 kV 60 Hz overhead line	isolated freight operator

Several additional heritage railways operate electric excursions on former main lines, including the East Troy Electric Railroad (7 miles [11 km] of tracks) and Western Railway Museum (10 miles [16 km] of tracks).

== History of electrification projects in the United States ==
=== Smoke abatement ===
==== Cleveland Union Terminals Co. ====
In June 1929 this railroad switched from steam to electric operation on a 17-mile (27 km) route between Collinwood and Linndale in Ohio. A 3000 V DC overhead system was used. This change of operation was for smoke abatement. Electric operation ceased in 1953.

==== New York Central Railroad (Hudson and Harlem Divisions) ====
The New York Central electrified a section of its main line Hudson Division route in 1913 from New York City (Grand Central Terminal) to Harmon (now Croton-Harmon), where it changed to at first steam, then diesel power. The Harlem Division in Westchester County, New York was also electrified to North White Plains. Metro-North Railroad, the successor to New York Central's commuter operations, continues to use these lines, and extended the Harlem Line electrification to Southeast in 1984. The lines are electrified at 750 V DC with under-running third rail.

The Hudson Line is used by Amtrak for intercity passenger service to and via Albany, but these trains run to Penn Station via the Empire Connector, and only in the underground area in and near that station do Amtrak's dual-mode (diesel and electric) locomotives shift to using the overrunning DC third rail.

=== Tunnels ===
==== Baltimore and Ohio Railroad ====
The construction of the Howard Street tunnel through Baltimore in order to make a rail connection to New York City brought about the world's first mainline electrification. Operation began in 1895 with three General Electric locomotives. These locomotives only worked pulling northbound trains; southbound traffic simply coasted through this section, which was all downhill. Initially the system used a unique overhead track in which the current shoe rode, but shortly after it was converted to a conventional 675 V DC third rail system. The electrification was discontinued in 1952 when dieselization made it unnecessary.

==== Boston & Maine Railroad (Hoosac Tunnel) ====
The Hoosac Tunnel was electrified by the Boston & Maine Railroad in May 1911. This was done to speed up trains and to reduce smoke in the tunnel. Electricity was provided from the Zylonite power plant in Adams, MA. The electrification was switched off in August 1946 with the arrival of diesel locomotives on the route.

==== Grand Trunk Railway (St. Clair Tunnel) ====
The St. Clair Tunnel is the name for two separate rail tunnels which were built under the St. Clair River between Sarnia, Ontario and Port Huron, Michigan. It was the first full-size (i.e. able to allow a railroad to run through it) subaqueous tunnel built in North America.

Steam locomotives were used in the early years to pull trains through the tunnel, however concerns about the potential dangers of suffocation should a train stall in the tunnel led to the installation of catenary wires for electric-powered locomotives by 1907. The first use of electric locomotives through the tunnel in regular service occurred on May 17, 1908.

The electric-powered locomotives were retired in 1958 and scrapped in 1959 after CNR retired and scrapped its last steam-powered locomotives on trains passing through the tunnel. New diesel-powered locomotives did not cause the same problems with air quality in this relatively short tunnel.

==== Great Northern Railway (Cascade Tunnel) ====
The Great Northern Railway (now BNSF Railway) electrified the 2.5-mile (4.0 km) original Cascade Tunnel in 1909, near the summit of Stevens Pass in the Cascade Mountains. This first electrification system with GE-built boxcabs were the only three-phase AC power ever used on North America railroads, see Three-phase AC railway electrification. The electric boxcabs pulled trains through the tunnel with their steam locomotives still attached until they were retired in 1927.

In 1925 work began on the new 7.8-mile (12.6 km) Cascade Tunnel, with the Great Northern ultimately electrifying a 73-mile (117 km) section of its main line route to Seattle, Washington from Wenatchee to Skykomish. The new tunnel and electrification reduced the mainline by 9 miles (14 km), eliminated 502 feet (153 m) of elevation and 6 miles (9.7 km) of snow sheds. Electric locomotives handled mainline freight and passenger trains on this section exclusively. The route was de-energized and catenary dismantled in 1956, after the Cascade Tunnel was fitted with ventilation fans.

==== Michigan Central Railroad (Detroit Tunnel Lines) ====
The Michigan Central Railroad electrified the tunnels under the Detroit river in 1910. The system used a 600 V DC under-running third rail.

The electrification covered a total of 4.5 miles (7.2 km) between two passenger stations in Detroit and Windsor. The total track mileage covered around 28.5 miles (45.9 km), which included not only the station and tunnel lines but also an extensive yard.

The electrification was discontinued in the early 1950s when the tunnel was ventilated so that diesels could run through.

=== Mountainous terrain ===
==== Butte, Anaconda and Pacific Railway ====
The BA&P, a copper ore-hauling short line in Montana, electrified in 1913 using a 2,400 V DC system engineered by General Electric. It was the first primarily freight railroad in North America to electrify. Original motive power was in the form of 28 identical B-B boxcabs, which served until de-electrification in 1967, by which time diesel-electric locomotives were cheaper to run. GE used the BA&P as a model railroad for demonstrating the success of its DC electrification techniques. The Milwaukee Road electrified soon afterward using a similar technique at 3,000 V DC.

==== Chicago, Milwaukee and St. Paul Railroad (the Milwaukee Road) ====
The Chicago, Milwaukee and St. Paul Railroad ('Pacific' was not added to the title until incorporation in 1927) electrified two of its mountainous divisions using a DC overhead system. The two divisions were widely separated from each other, but plans to electrify the intervening 212 miles (341 km), the relatively flat Idaho Division from Avery to Othello, were never implemented.

The electrification system was similar to that of the Butte, Anaconda & Pacific, but was at 3000 V DC rather than 2400 V DC. The higher voltage was chosen because of the load conditions with 2,500 ton trains.

===== Rocky Mountain Division (Harlowton to Avery) =====
The first division to be electrified was the Rocky Mountain Division from Harlowton, Montana to Avery, Idaho. This covered a distance of 438 miles (705 km) and began electric operation in 1917. The electrification remained in operation until 1974, when diesel locomotives took over. There were two main reasons for electrifying this division. The first was to get through the Bitter Root Mountains, which are steeply graded. The second was that the line passes through an important forest reserve of the US Government. Steam trains were a fire hazard, and thus electric trains lessened the risk.

===== Coast Division (Othello to Tacoma/Seattle) =====
The second division to be electrified was the Coast Division between Othello, Washington to Tacoma, and to Black River just south of Seattle. This covered a distance of 207 miles (333 km) and began electric operation in 1919. The electrification remained in operation until 1972, when diesel locomotives took over. The main reason for electrifying was to get over the Saddle Mountains.

==== Norfolk and Western Railway ====
The Norfolk and Western Railway (N&W) had an electrified district of 52 miles (84 km) from Bluefield to Iaeger, West Virginia, between 1913 and 1950. It was an 11 kV, 25 Hz overhead electrification in a mountain region with a major tunnel (Elkhorn Tunnel). When the grade was bypassed with a new line in 1950, the line was abandoned. Despite most other US railroads dieselizing at this time, the N&W would not begin this process until 1955, thus making the Elkhorn Grade the last American electric rail line to be replaced by steam traction.

==== Virginian Railway ====
The VGN had an electrified district of 134 miles (216 km) of mountainous terrain built in the 1920s from Roanoke, Virginia to Mullens, West Virginia. It went to the N&W with the 1959 merger and was de-electrified in 1962.

=== Traffic density ===
==== Amtrak ====
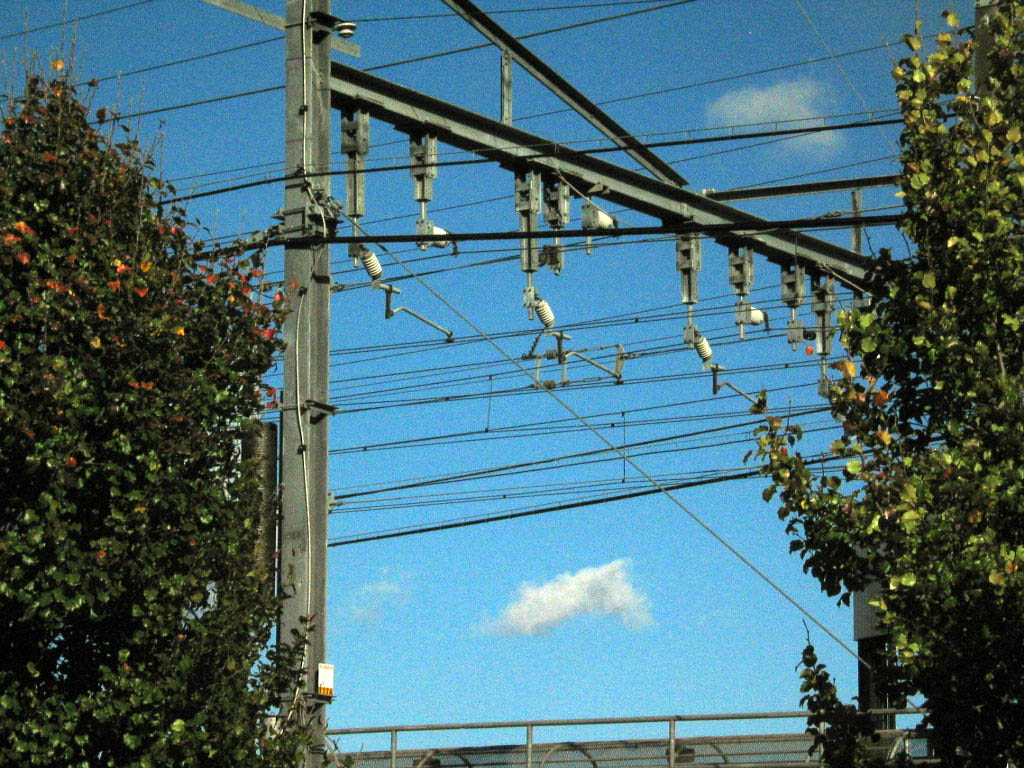
Constant Tension Catenary along the 60 Hz portion of Amtrak's Northeast Corridor.

Amtrak, the national intercity passenger railroad, inherited a 1930s-era 11 kV 25 Hz electrification system from the Pennsylvania Railroad (PRR), which it is slowly modernizing, and has completed two electrification projects on its own lines.

A short portion of the Empire Connection was electrified when it was built in 1991, allowing trains from Albany direct access to Penn Station New York by use of dual-mode locomotives. Track near the terminal was electrified with 750 V DC third rail, compatible with the third rail system used within Penn Station by the Long Island Rail Road (LIRR).

The Northeast Corridor mainline from New Haven to Boston was electrified in 1999, completing the thwarted ambition of the former New York, New Haven and Hartford Railroad. This electrification was part of the Acela Express high-speed project, and involved the building of overhead lines electrified at 25 kV 60 Hz, requiring trains to handle a change of voltage on the fly at New Haven. Plans to convert the rest of the Northeast Corridor to 60 Hz have been shelved, although the section from New Haven to the Hell Gate Bridge has been converted to 60 Hz by Metro-North.

==== Boston, Revere Beach and Lynn Railroad ====
This railroad changed from steam to electric operation in 1928 using a 600 V DC overhead system. The company filed for bankruptcy in 1937, and ceased operating in 1940. In 1952 a section of the line between East Boston and Revere was bought by the MBTA and is now a part of the Blue Line. The remainder of the line to Lynn is owned by the Commonwealth of Massachusetts and may be used for further expansion of the Blue Line.

==== Erie Railroad (Rochester Division) ====
In June 1907, the Erie Railroad changed from steam to electric operation on its Rochester Division. A single phase AC system was used operating at 11 kV 25 Hz. The electrified section was between Rochester, NY to Mount Morris, NY, a distance of 34 miles (55 km). The system lasted in operation until 1934.

==== New York, New Haven and Hartford Railroad ====
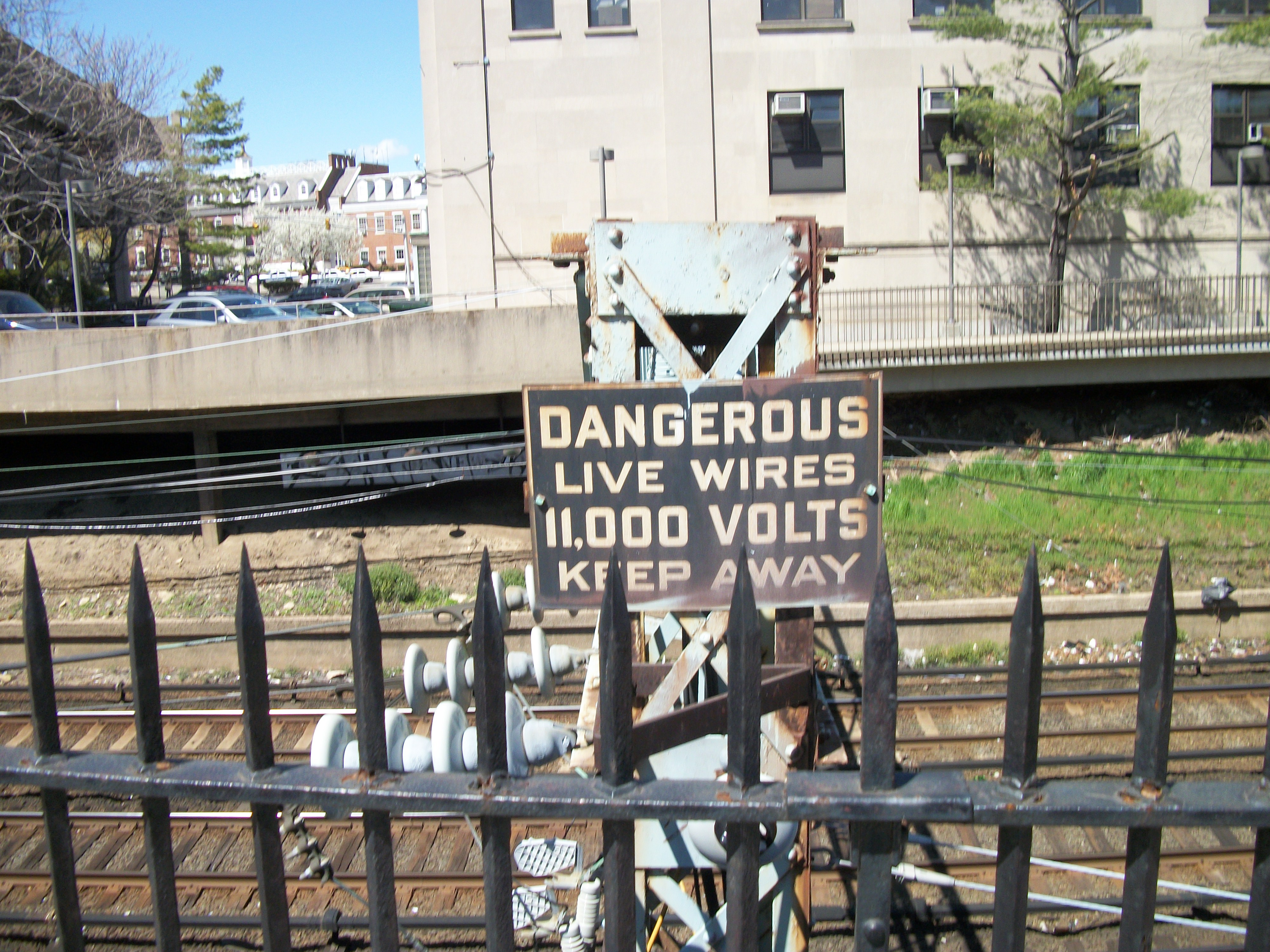
A former catenary along the New Haven Railroad main line in Mount Vernon, New York.

The New York, New Haven and Hartford Railroad completed electrification in 1907 of its New Haven–New York City mainline and was one of the pioneers of heavy electric railway use in the United States. The New Haven chose the 11 kV 25 Hz system, later used by the PRR, in addition to working with Westinghouse to develop AC/DC electric motors (locomotives) to run on both AC overhead lines and DC third rail. The main line, now Metro-North Railroad's New Haven Line, was converted to 12.5 kV 60 Hz in 1985.

==== Pennsylvania Railroad ====
The Pennsylvania Railroad carried out many electrification projects.

===== West Jersey and Seashore Railroad =====
The PRR, owner of West Jersey & Seashore Railroad (WJ&S), electrified with 600 V DC from Camden, New Jersey to Atlantic City, via Newfield, and to Millville. A third-rail system was used for most of the line except overhead trolley wire was installed between Mickle Street in Camden and Gloucester City as well as a 10-mile (16 km) segment between Newfield and Millville. The Camden-Gloucester City portion was installed due to a decision to use the old Camden Seventh Street line as part of the route. Numerous grade crossings on both this segment and in Gloucester City precluded the use of third rail due to public safety considerations. The Millville branch, however, was equipped with overhead wire as a "method of comparing the durability of trolley wire versus third rail under high-speed open-country operating conditions." The WJ&S ordered 62 coaches and six combination baggage mail units split between Jackson and Sharp Company, and J. G. Brill and Company at Philadelphia, which had 46 cars from the order. Brill sublet work on 22 coaches to its Wason subsidiary in Springfield, Massachusetts.

The electrification was opened in 1906 with cars that resembled wooden interurbans of other electric traction properties. The same year the 1906 Atlantic City train wreck occurred, in which a three-car train of the new equipment derailed and fell into a waterway; 53 people died. Other cars were built in 1909 bringing the fleet total to 80 MP1 and MP2 class wooden MU coaches. The 19 purchased in 1909 had steel instead of wooden ends and featured PRR porthole style windows on each end. There were six MO1 class passenger-baggage combines including two with steel ends, four MBM1 baggage-mail cars and two MB1 baggage-express cars. In 1912, the PRR assigned two MPB54 all-steel combines and 15 all-steel MP54 coaches to WJ&S. WJ&S and the Reading subsidiary Atlantic City Railroad were merged into Pennsylvania-Reading Seashore Lines (P-RSL) in 1932.

Electric MU service between Newfield and Atlantic City ended Sept. 26, 1931 so P-RSL only inherited the electrified Millville commuter rail service from WJ&S. On Oct. 20, 1948, New Jersey's public utility regulators ordered P-RSL to remove all remaining 26 wooden MU coaches from service as a safety hazard should they be involved in fire or collision. P-RSL management already was considering replacing the MUs due to an aging power distribution system and obsolete rolling stock. So nearly two-thirds of the MU fleet was removed from service. With only the PRR style all-steel MUs left for passenger service, P-RSL cut back the electrified commuter service to Glassboro, New Jersey in fall 1948 and management then ordered an end to all remaining electrification as of Sept. 8, 1949. On that date a morning commuter run from Glassboro to Camden ended 43 years of electrification. Non-electrified commuter rail service to Glassboro and Millville continued until March 5, 1971.

===== New York Terminal =====
Electrification was installed from Sunnyside Yard in Queens, through New York Penn Station to Manhattan Transfer station in New Jersey. A 675 V DC third rail (Top Contact) system was used. Electrification was later changed to 11 kV 25 Hz overhead catenary, when the PRR electrified its mainline to Washington, D. C. in the early 1930s. Third rail is still installed in the East River Tunnels in order to provide power the LIRR trains. Third rail is also installed in the North River Tunnels for use in emergencies should power be lost to the overhead catenary.

===== Paoli =====
A section of the Chicago-Philadelphia Main Line (now part of Amtrak's Keystone Corridor) was electrified in 1915. The suburban service runs between the former Broad Street Station in Philadelphia and the village of Paoli. The PRR electrification utilized overhead catenary wires electrified at 11 kV 25 Hz, and was fed by four substations in Arsenal, West Philadelphia, Bryn Mawr, and Paoli. It was expanded in 1919 on the PRR's Chestnut Hill line, and in the 1920s on the Philadelphia-Washington, D.C. main line between Philadelphia and Wilmington, and on the West Chester Line between Philadelphia and West Chester, with the latter two lines being fed through a single substation located in Chester.

===== New York–Washington =====
Extensive electrification after 1925 occurred on the PRR's New York-Washington line (now part of the Northeast Corridor), the Chicago-Philadelphia Main Line between Paoli and Harrisburg, several major commuter lines in Pennsylvania and New Jersey, and on major low-grade, through-freight lines, including the Trenton Cutoff, the Atglen & Susquehanna, Port Road, Philadelphia & Thorndale, Shellpot, and Enola branches. All electrification done after 1919 used the same catenary supports used on the Paoli commuter line, but with the catenary being supplied with 100 kV 25 Hz "transmission" lines with the voltage stepped-down at substations located every 10 to 20 miles (16 to 32 km). PPL Corporation-owned Safe Harbor Dam, located near the Exelon-owned Peach Bottom Nuclear Power Plant between Conowingo, Maryland and York, Pennsylvania, supplies the power for all post-1925 electrical expansion projects, while Exelon supplies the pre-1925 electrification areas through the existing Philadelphia, Ardmore, and Chester substations. Plans were made in the thirties to extend electrification to Pittsburgh, but were not pursued due to the Great Depression.

Since its takeover by Amtrak in 1976, both the Northeast and Keystone Corridors are undergoing extensive wire replacements, either by Amtrak or SEPTA, while the through-freight branches taken over by Conrail have been de-electrified and freight operations carried out by diesel locomotives. Those lines that were de-electrified, but have transmission lines are maintained by Amtrak through arrangements through Conrail's successors, Norfolk Southern and CSX Transportation.

==== Rock Island & Southern Railway ====
This railroad electrified 52 miles (84 km) between Rock Island and Monmouth, Illinois using an 11 kV 25 Hz system.

==== Spokane & Inland Empire Railroad ====
In 1906, this railroad electrified from Spokane to Colfax, Washington and Moscow, Idaho using a 6600 V 25 Hz system.

=== Suburban commuter operations ===
==== Boston, Revere Beach and Lynn ====
From 1928 to its abandonment in 1940, the narrow-gauge Boston, Revere Beach and Lynn Railroad was operated with overhead electrification. The railroad shut down in 1940, and portions of it were used for the MBTA Blue Line which opened in 1953, although it used an entirely new electrification system and is operated as part of a subway system.

==== Caltrain ====
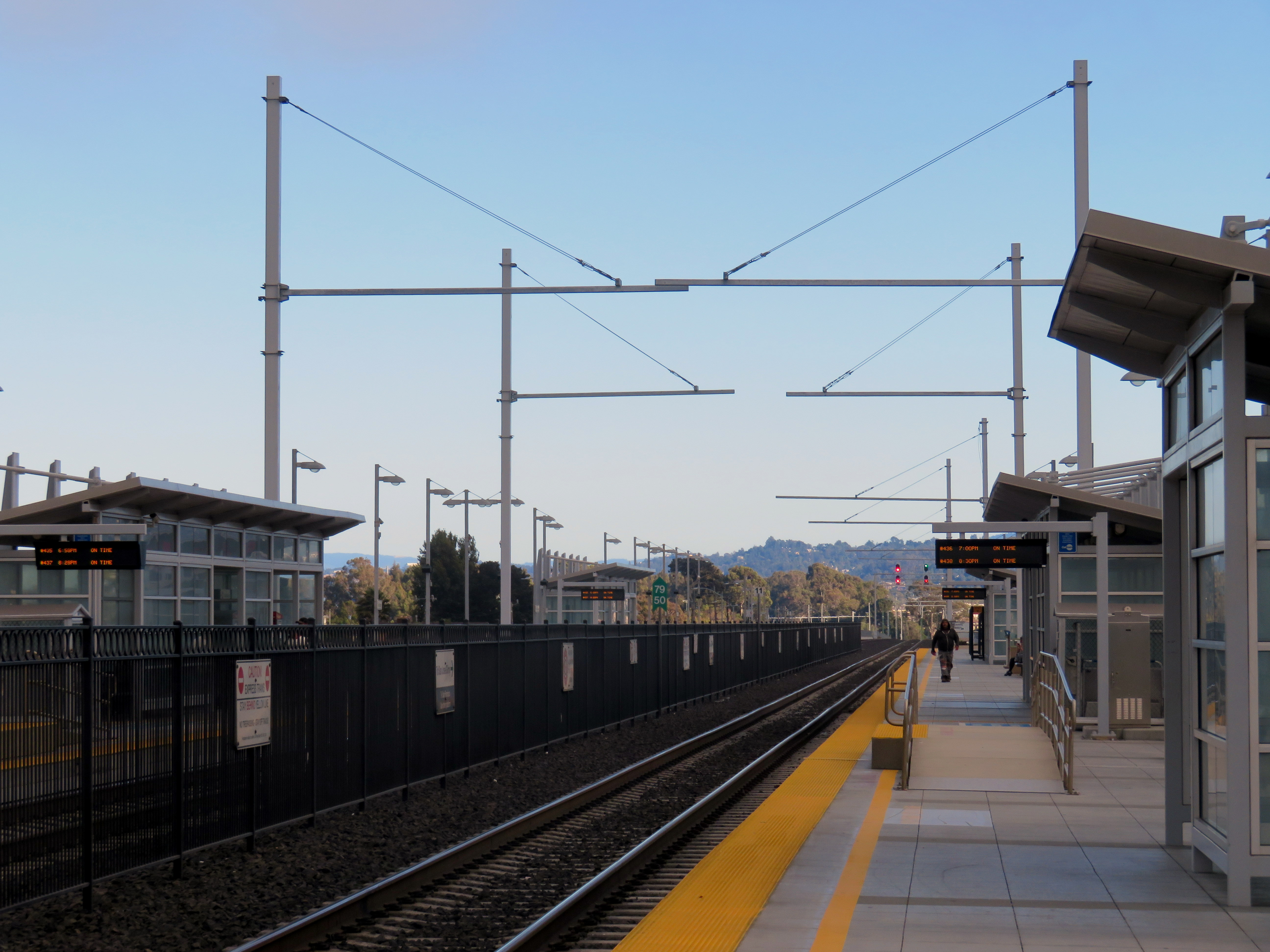
Newly installed catenary structures at Caltrain's San Bruno station, July 2018

The Caltrain Modernization Program (CalMod) was a $2.44 billion project that electrified the railroad's main line, which serves cities in the San Francisco Peninsula and Silicon Valley. Caltrain's service had previously existed almost unchanged in its current form since it was operated as the Peninsula Commute by the Southern Pacific Railroad in the late 19th century, but proposals for electrifying the line had begun as early as 1992. The project lay dormant due to lack of funding until Caltrain agreed to share its tracks with the California High-Speed Rail Authority. The CalMod project resulted in the electrification of the 51 miles (82 km) of tracks between 4th and King station and Tamien Station and was officially completed on September 21, 2024. The new electrical infrastructure included the installation of approximately 130 to 140 miles (210 to 230 km) of 25 kV 60 Hz single-phase AC overhead contact lines and ten new power stations (two traction power stations, a switching station approximately halfway along the line, and seven paralleling stations).

==== Delaware, Lackawanna and Western Railroad / Morris and Essex Railroad ====
What are now New Jersey Transit's Morris & Essex Lines (the Morristown Line and Gladstone Branch) and Montclair-Boonton Line were electrified by the Delaware, Lackawanna and Western Railroad at 3000 V DC in 1930/31. By August 1984 the lines had all been converted to 25 kV 60 Hz by NJ Transit.

==== Denver RTD ====
In 2015 a new commuter rail system commenced operation in the Denver metropolitan area with a new electrification network operated at 25 kV 60 Hz. Lines emanate from Denver Union Station and run to Denver International Airport, Westminster, and Wheat Ridge, and Thornton.

==== Illinois Central Railroad ====
The Illinois Central Railroad electrified its three commuter lines serving Chicago in 1926 pursuant to ordinances passed by the city. The IC commuter lines remain electrified and are now operated as the Metra Electric District. The catenary is energized at 1500 V DC and serves four tracks of commuter operations. Two tracks are unelectrified and used for freight and Amtrak service to downstate Illinois and beyond.

==== Long Island Rail Road ====
The Long Island Rail Road's electrification was initiated in the first decade of the 20th century while it was owned by the Pennsylvania Railroad, which was building tunnels under the Hudson River and East River to gain access to Manhattan. The first segment of the LIRR to be electrified was the trackage between the Atlantic Avenue terminal in Brooklyn and Jamaica station. Electrification extended east of Jamaica to the Belmont Park station in 1905. In 1910, the opening of Pennsylvania Station (New York City) ushered in electric service between that station and Jamaica. The LIRR's Port Washington Branch was rebuilt and electrified by 1918. By 1934, LIRR branches to Mineola, Hempstead, West Hempstead, Far Rockaway, Long Beach, and Babylon were electrified. In 1970, electrification was extended to Hicksville, and to Huntington on the Port Jefferson Branch. In 1987, electrification of the Main Line between Hicksville and Ronkonkoma was completed, resulting in greatly increased service.

The LIRR utilizes third rail electrification, which was the original method used by the PRR. By the 1930s, the PRR had switched to overhead catenary electrification, but the LIRR has continued utilizing its third rail system. Voltage was increased from 600 V DC to 750 V DC in the early 1970s to meet the greater power needs of the railroad's new M-1 cars.

==== New York, Westchester and Boston Railway ====
This railroad operation its suburban train service with electric service. The 4-track main line ran for 7 miles (11 km) from Westchester Ave. in New York to Mount Vernon, NY. From Mount Vernon the line split into two 2-track lines; one to New Rochelle, NY (2 miles (3.2 km)) and a second to White Plains, NY (9.4 miles (15.1 km)).

==== Reading Co. ====
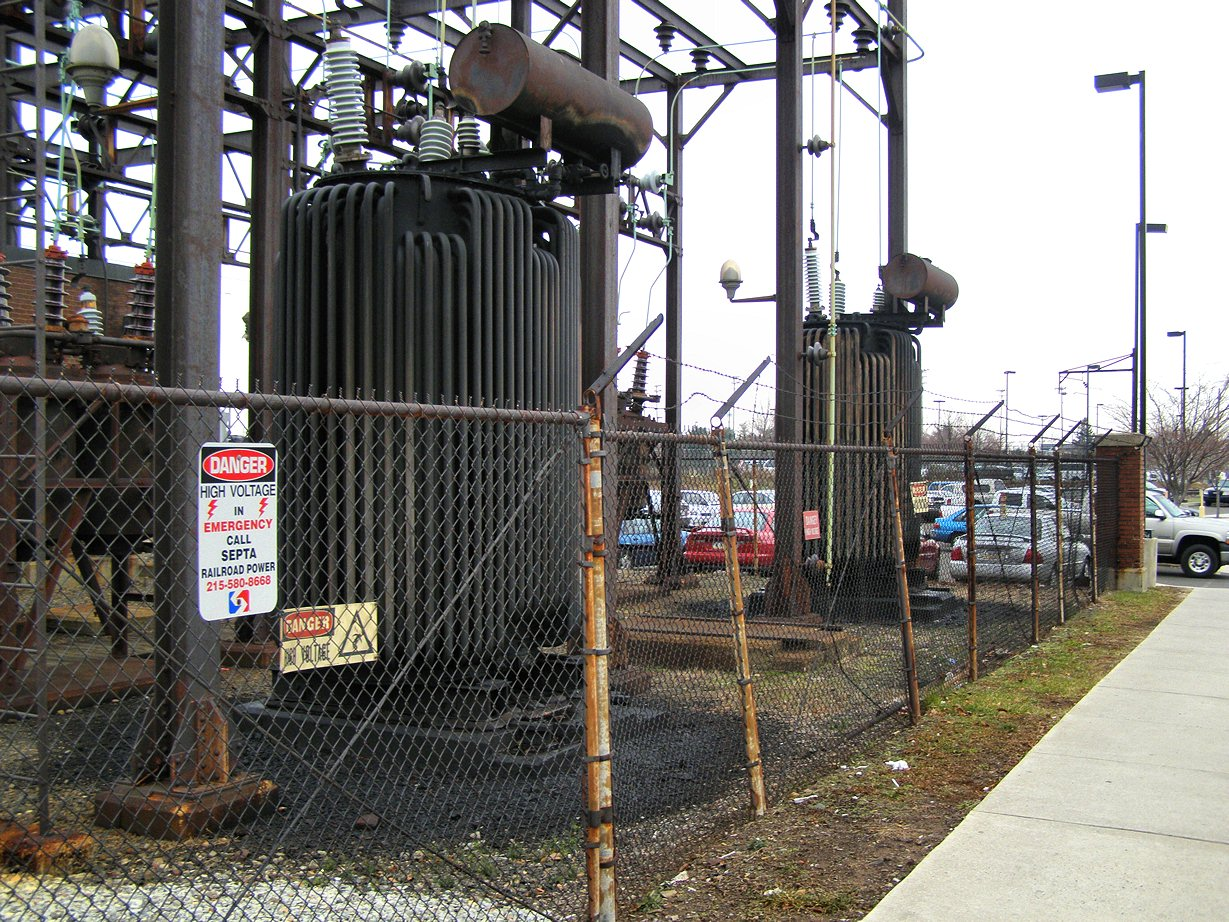
Original 1930s autotransformer equipment installed by the Reading Railroad in Lansdale, Pennsylvania.

Electrification on the Reading Company began during the late 1920s. The first stage was placed in operation on July 26, 1931, when electric suburban trains began serving the Bethlehem Branch between Reading Terminal, Philadelphia and Lansdale, the Doylestown Branch between Lansdale and Doylestown, the New Hope Branch between Glenside and Hatboro, and the Jersey City Branch between Jenkintown and West Trenton, New Jersey. The second stage, the Norristown and Chestnut Hill branches, was opened on February 5, 1933. Like the PRR Paoli commuter line, the Reading employed overhead catenary wire powered at 11 kV 25 Hz, but unlike the PRR, the Reading used a single generator, located at Wayne Junction, with long-distance lines being supplied by spider-frame pylons that can still be seen, mostly along the Schuylkill Expressway (I-76).

Extensions of electrification over intercity lines, such as West Trenton-Jersey City, Norristown-Reading-Harrisburg, and Lansdale-Bethlehem were planned, but because of the Great Depression, they were dropped. Only two expansion projects, carried out by the Reading with funding from SEPTA, were that of the Newtown Branch between Newtown Junction and Fox Chase in September 1966, and the Warminster Branch between Hatboro and Warminster in 1974.

Since the takeover of the Reading commuter lines in 1983, SEPTA has rehabilitated the catenary wires between the Center City Commuter Connection and Wayne Junction, and on all ex-Reading tracks owned by SEPTA. Those sections of ex-Reading tracks owned by Conrail, and later by CSX, are being done on a step-by-step basis.

==== South Shore Line ====
Northern Indiana Commuter Transportation District operates electric service along the South Shore Line, which runs from South Bend, Indiana to Chicago, partly via the Metra Electric District. Commuter trains are fully electrified via 1500 V DC overhead line. Freight operations along the line utilize diesel locomotion.

=== Freight operations ===
==== Texas Transportation Company ====
The Texas Transportation Company operated a small Class III railroad in San Antonio until 2001, mostly serving the Pearl Brewery. It had a connection to the Southern Pacific Railroad, and briefly hosted passenger service in the 1980s with a former San Antonio trolley.

==== Black Mesa and Lake Powell Railroad ====
The BM&LP was an isolated short line in Arizona which hauled coal from a mine near Kayenta to the Navajo Generating Station power plant at Page. When built in 1973, it was the first line to use 50 kV 60 Hz overhead catenary. The coal it hauled on the 78 miles (126 km) was used by the power plant at its western terminus to power the line itself. The line did not connect to any other part of the American rail network. Operations on the line ceased on August 26, 2019.

==== Muskingum Electric Railroad ====
This line operated between a coal mine and power generation station in southeast Ohio. It was electrified its entire life from its construction in 1968 to its dismantling around 2004. The line utilized 50,000 volt AC catenary to power GE E50C locomotives.

==== Mason City & Clear Lake Traction Co. ====
This is a 10-mile (16 km) line in Iowa that was built to connect Mason City with Clear Lake. Initially it operated a passenger service using a 600 V overhead system. In 1961 it was sold to investors and renamed as Iowa Terminal. In 1987 the line was purchased once more and was renamed to Iowa Traction Railway (IATR) where it now operates as a freight only railway.

==== Deseret-Western Railway ====
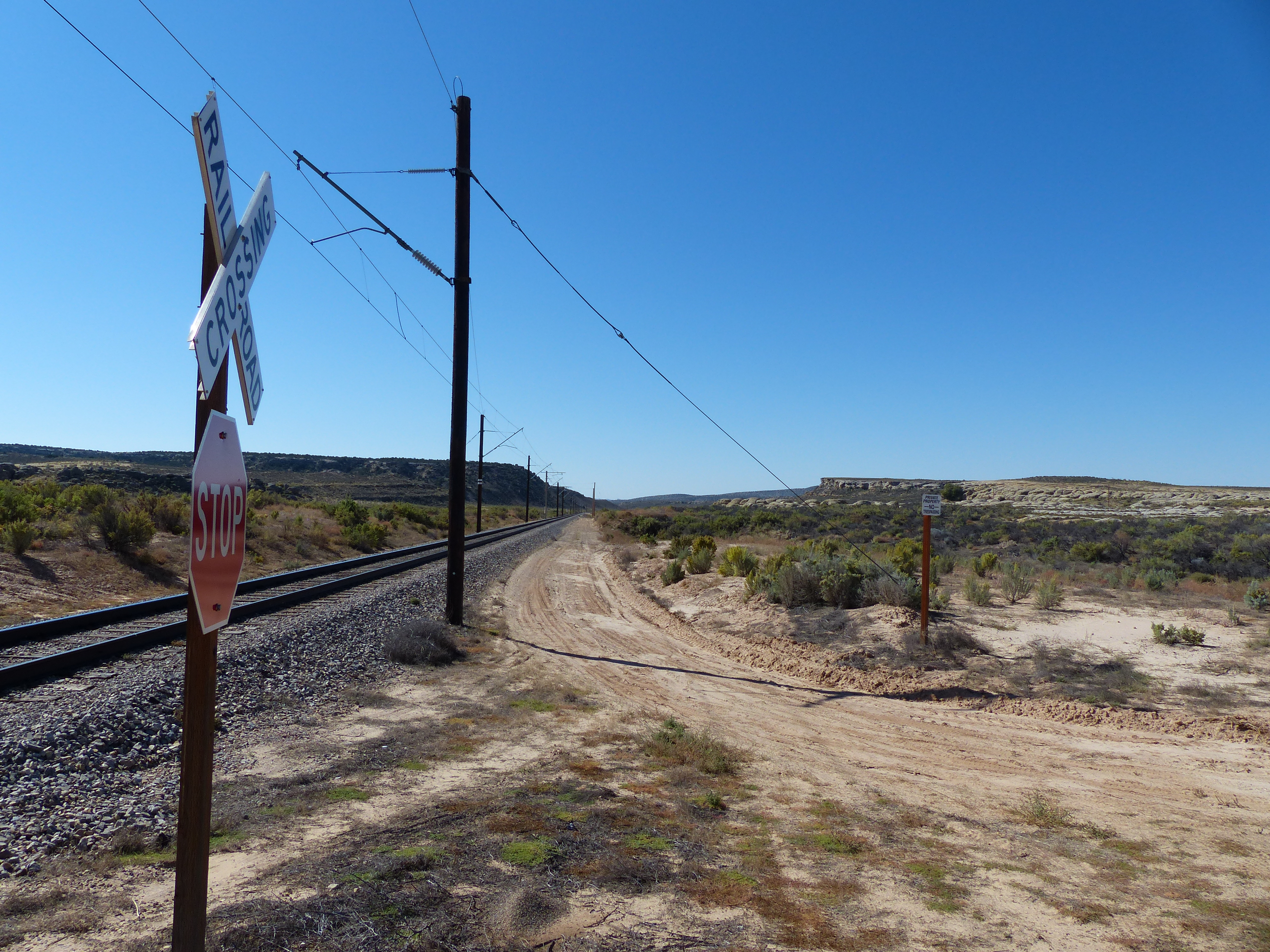
Catenary along the Deseret Power Railroad

The Deseret Power Railroad (reporting mark DPRW), formerly known as the Deseret-Western Railway, is an isolated short line between Colorado and Utah which hauls coal from Deserado Mine to Bonanza Power Plant. It was built in 1983 and opened on January 4, 1984. Electrification is at 50 kv AC overhead wire. The coal it hauls on the 33 miles (53 km) is used by the power plant at its western terminus to power the line itself. The line does not connect to the national rail network.

==== Navajo Mine Railroad ====
The Navajo Mine Railroad (reporting mark TNMR) operates between the Four Corners Generating Station and BHP's Navajo Coal Mine in New Mexico. The line started operation in 1974 using diesel locomotives and was electrified in 1984 because diesel operation was too expensive with the increasing train loads, fuel prices and problems with clogged oil bath filters on the diesel locomotives due to the excessive coal dust. Electrification was at 25 kV 60 Hz AC overhead line. The railroad does not have any connection to the rest of the American rail network. Electric operations were discontinued in 2019 in favor of GE ET44AC diesel locomotives.

==== Martin Lake Line ====
The Martin Lake Line, owned by Luminant, once operated an electrified coal hauling line operating between mines in Beckville to the Martin Lake Power Plant in Texas. The railroad operated GE E25Bs and GE E60s, but electrification was dismantled and dieselized in the early 2010s.

== Testing ==
The Transportation Technology Center in Pueblo, Colorado maintains a test track 48 miles (77 km) in length. Acela trains are tested at this site.

== See also ==
- Rail transportation in the United States
- List of railway electrification systems
