= West Jersey and Seashore Railroad =

American railway company

Overview
- Parent company: Pennsylvania Railroad (1930–1933); Pennsylvania-Reading Seashore Lines (1933–1976)
- Headquarters: Camden, New Jersey, U.S.
- Locale: Camden and Winslow Junction to Atlantic City and Millville/Cape May, New Jersey
- Dates of operation: 1896–1976
- Successor: Conrail

Technical
- Track gauge: 4 ft 8 1/2 in (1,435 mm) standard gauge
- Electrification: 600 V DC third rail

The West Jersey and Seashore Railroad (WJ&S) was a railway company in the U.S. state of New Jersey with a connection to Philadelphia. It was formed through the merger of several smaller roads in May 1896. At the end of 1925 it operated 379 miles (610 km) of road on 717 miles (1,154 km) of track; that year it reported 166 million ton-miles of revenue freight and 332 million passenger-miles. The Pennsylvania Railroad leased the company in 1930; this lease was transferred to the Pennsylvania-Reading Seashore Lines in 1933. Its property was conveyed to Conrail in 1976.

== History ==
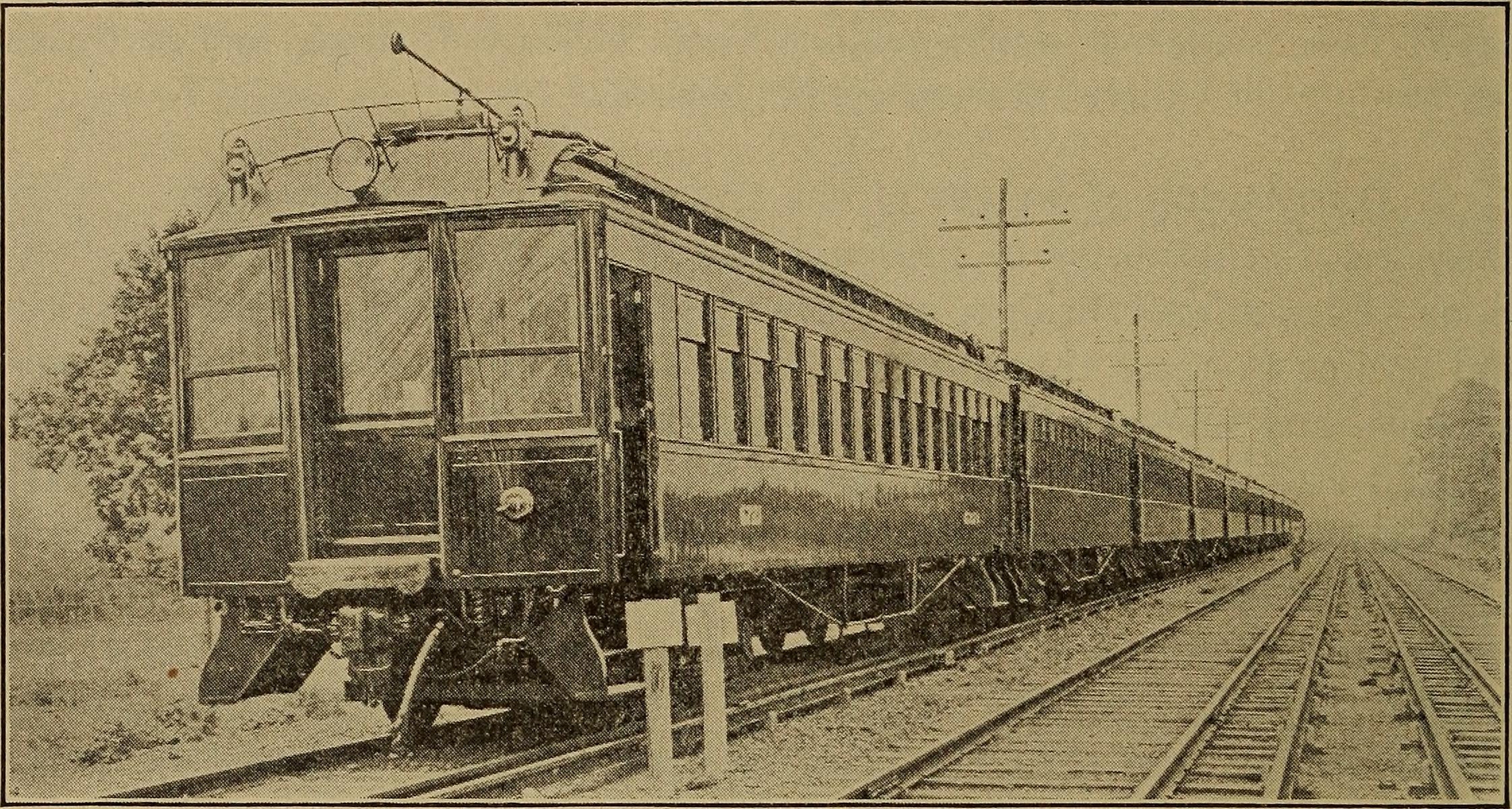
Electric traction was used on the West Jersey and Seashore Railroad, 1906

On May 4, 1896, the Pennsylvania Railroad (PRR) consolidated all its railroads and several smaller properties in southern New Jersey into the West Jersey and Seashore Railroad (WJ&S). This included the West Jersey Railroad, the Alloway and Quinton Railroad, the Camden and Atlantic Railroad, the Chelsea Branch Railroad, and the Philadelphia, Marlton and Medford Railroad. The consolidation was originally scheduled to occur in March 1896. But at a meeting held on March 21, it was agreed that there was not enough time given for proxy votes to arrive from stockholders who were not local to New Jersey; the deadline for proxies was then extended to April 6, 1896. Representatives of each of the constituent lines met on May 2, 1896, and all agreed to the merger, to become effective as soon as paperwork could be filed in Trenton.

The WJ&S, as a subsidiary of the PRR, had two lines coming from its Federal Street Terminal in Camden:

- The Main Line to Atlantic City and other shore points via Winslow Junction using trackage rights on ACRR's Cape May Branch to Woodbine Junction and its Cape May line to Ocean City, Wildwood, and Cape May.
- The Millville Line via Woodbury to Milville and splitting off at Newfield to Atlantic City was electrified with 650 V DC third rail, and overhead wire.
- A line branching off at Millville
- Branches going to Salem and Deep Water Point from Woodbury and Bridgeton from Glassboro.

On October 28, 1906, an accident in Atlantic City killed 53 people when a three-car train plunged off an open swing bridge.

== Predecessor railroads ==
=== Camden and Atlantic Railroad ===
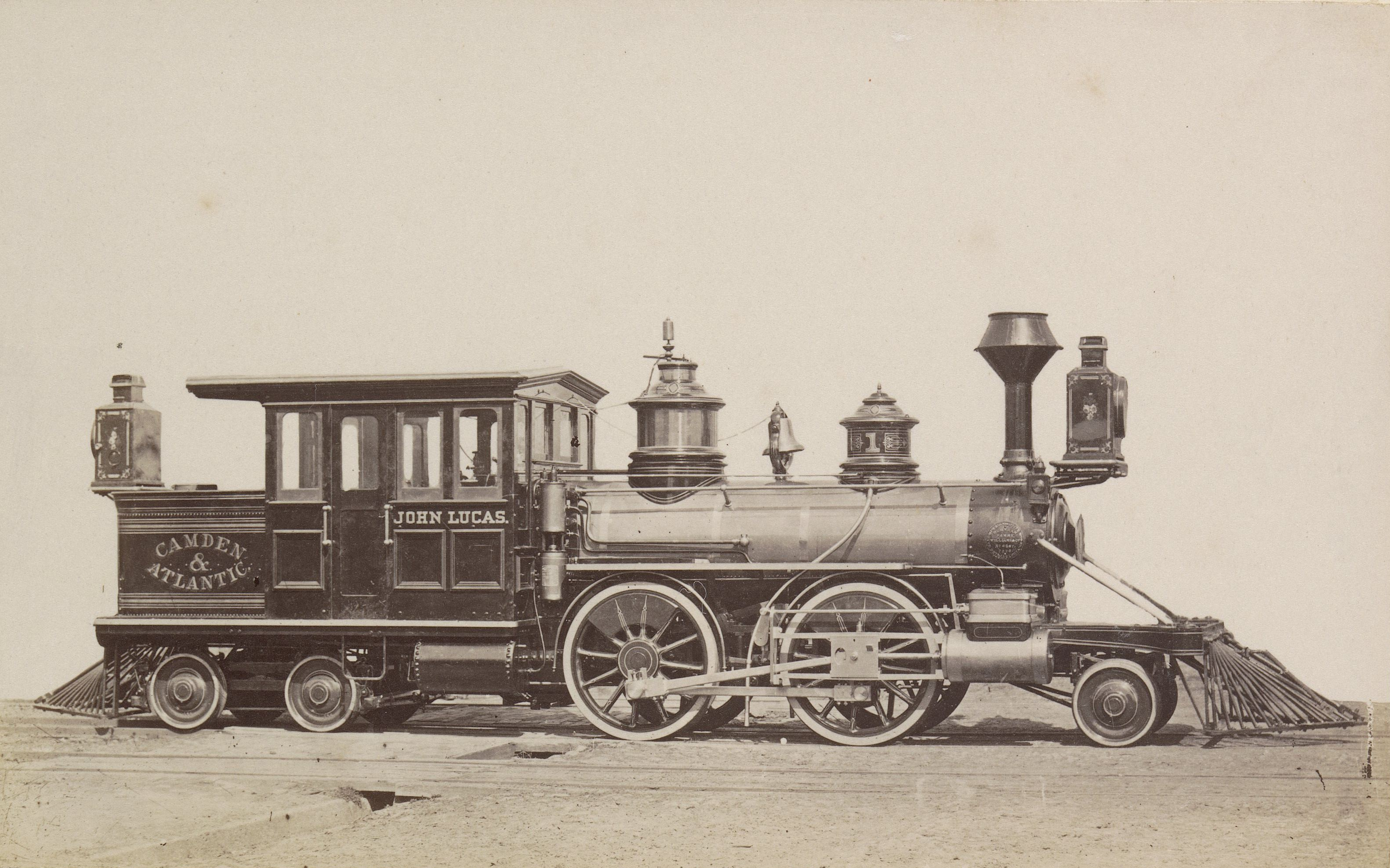
2-4-4 locomotive John Lucas

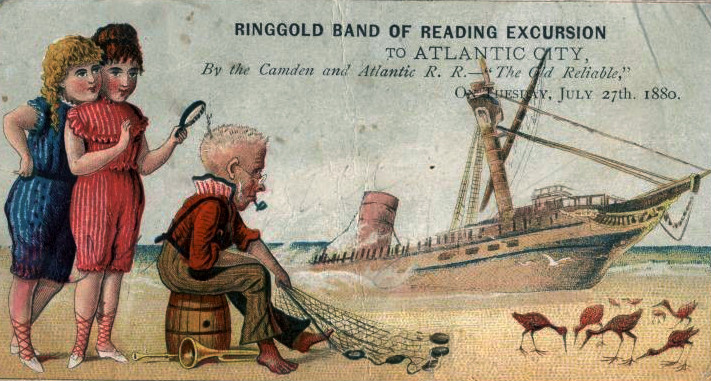
Card promoting an 1880 excursion on the railroad.

This railroad was granted its charter by the state of New Jersey on March 19, 1852.

The line was built from Camden to Atlantic City via Berlin. In late June 1854, it was completed sans the drawbridge over the thoroughfare outside of Atlantic City; regular passenger service started on July 4, with more than 3,000 people carried on the first day. The line proved so popular that the rival 3 ft 6 in (1,067 mm) gauge Philadelphia and Atlantic City Railway, which was chartered in 1876, paralleled its mainline between Camden and Atlantic City.

The railroad sent gangs of men to help fight a massive forest fire, that is estimated to have caused more than $200,000 (equivalent to $6,672,414 in 2025) in damages, in May 1880 with the goal of preventing the fire from reaching Atlantic City.

After some financial dealings in 1882 that may have involved bribery of a C&A clerk to obtain a list of stockholders, the PRR gained control of the Camden and Atlantic Railroad through its subsidiary West Jersey Railroad on January 1, 1883.

The main line built and operated by the C&A remains in use in the 21st century for passenger service by PATCO and NJ Transit's Atlantic City Line.

=== West Jersey Railroad ===
The West Jersey Railroad (WJ) opened its books on March 29, 1853, subscribing $250,000 in capital. It was granted its charter by the state of New Jersey on February 5, 1853, to build a line from Camden, New Jersey to Cape May, New Jersey. An additional stock subscription of 1,000 shares by one director amounting to $200,000 was made at the company's meeting on May 17, bringing the total subscriptions to $450,000. Surveys of possible routes were made fairly quickly, and the directors of the company met on July 15, 1853, to select the route on which they would build. The line was then built in stages with the backing of the C&A from Camden to Glassboro. The first 8.2 miles (13.2 km) of the line using the abandoned right-of-way built by the Camden and Woodbury Railroad was opened on April 15, 1857; then the extension to Glassboro opened on April 1, 1861, and to Bridgeton on July 25, 1861.

The line was completed in 1863. In that year the WJ directors decided to build a line to Bridgeton, New Jersey, and later build the line from Glassboro to Millville and Cape May. The right of way is now South Jersey/Philadelphia Shared Assets Operations Vineland Secondary freight rail line. The northern section is slated to become the light-rail Glassboro–Camden Line.

=== Millville and Glassboro Railroad ===
The 22-mile-long (35 km) Millville and Glassboro Railroad (M&G) was built by a group of Millville businessmen independently of the West Jersey Railroad. Chartered on March 9, 1859, and incorporated in March 1859, the M&G was completed and opened in October 1860. (Note: Charles K. Landis, the founder of Vineland, New Jersey, is reported to have first seen the area while riding the Millville and Glassboro Railroad in 1861.) The M&G started to build a line from Millville to Cape May, but funds dried up and the line was not completed. It was merged into the West Jersey railroad on April 1, 1868.

=== Cape May and Millville Railroad ===
In 1863, a group of Cape May County investors (Note: Benjamin F. Lee, who would later serve as clerk of the New Jersey Supreme Court from 1877 to 1897, was elected as the CM&M's Treasurer in 1863.) was granted a charter by the state of New Jersey on March 9, 1863, to build the Cape May & Millville Railroad (CM&M). The first trains ran on August 23, 1863. Construction was completed in 1867, with the full line extending 41 miles (66 km). It was leased to the WJ in 1869; and fully merged into the WJ on August 27, 1879. (Note: The Millville Centennial Souvenir book of 1966 says the merger happened on August 29, 1879.)

=== Salem Railroad ===
The 17-mile-long (27 km) Salem Railroad, chartered and incorporated on March 14, 1856, stretching from Elmer to Salem, New Jersey. Construction was completed in 1863, and the Salem Railroad was leased to the WJ on January 1, 1868. (Note: Wilson states that the Salem Railroad was leased to the West Jersey Railroad in June 1868.) The line was fully merged into the WJ on January 1, 1888.

=== Swedesboro Railroad ===
The Swedesboro Railroad, chartered on February 23, 1866, was built from Woodbury to Swedesboro 10.8 miles (17.4 km) by the WJ. Construction started in 1867, was leased to the WJ on August 17, 1869, opened on September 11, 1869, and was completed in October 1869. It was fully merged into the WJ on January 1, 1888.

=== Woodstown and Swedesboro Railroad ===
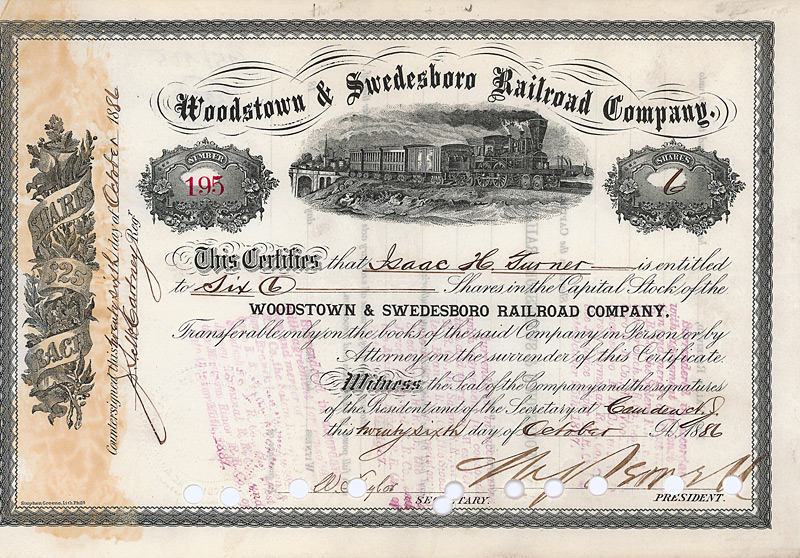
Share from the Woodstown and Swedesboro Railroad Company from October 26, 1886

The Woodstown and Swedesboro Railroad was chartered on March 21, 1871, opened on February 23, 1873, leased to the WJ on January 1, 1883, and fully merged on January 1, 1888.

On January 21, 1882, the WJ built a line from the end of the Swedesboro Railroad to Riddleton Junction on the Salem Railroad upon request of agricultural interests in Woodstown. Construction was in February 1883. This effectively gave the WJ two different routes into Salem.

=== Maurice River Railroad ===
The Maurice River Railroad was built by the WJ to obtain a share of the lucrative Delaware Bay oyster business. Incorporated on June 17, 1887, the 9.76-mile (15.71 km) long line stretched from Manumuskin to Maurice River. It was completed on November 1, 1887. The company was very soon merged into the WJ on January 1, 1888.

=== West Jersey and Atlantic Railroad ===
In 1879, the PRR directed the WJ to build a line from Newfield to Atlantic City via Mays Landing, New Jersey. After surveys were completed, it was incorporated on November 6, 1879, with construction starting the same month. Capital stock was valued at $500,000 (equivalent to $17,276,786 in 2025) at $50 per share. The 34.2-mile-long (55.0 km) line was completed on June 16, 1880. This railroad was ultimately leased to the WJ.

The line was abandoned from Newfield to Mays Landing on December 31, 1958. The segment from Mays Landing to McKee City followed on August 18, 1966. p. 275 In 2003, a portion of the line from Egg Harbor Township to Mays Landing was converted to a rail trail as part of the Atlantic County Bikeway.

=== Philadelphia Marlton and Medford Railroad ===
This railroad was chartered on January 7, 1880, and incorporated in January 1880, and construction began in April 1880. Trains began operating from Haddonfield to Marlton by July 1881, and began service to Medford on October 11, 1881. (Note: A Camden newspaper report suggests that the start of service was on October 17.) In January 1885 it was operated by the Camden and Atlantic, and later as the Medford Branch of the West Jersey and Seashore Railroad. The last passenger train ran on September 24, 1927. The Medford Branch was officially taken out of service on November 2, 1931.

The PM&M had stops at Haddonfield, Freeman, Orchard, Springdale, Locust Grove, Cropwell, Marlton, Elmwood Road, Melrose, and Medford. All except Haddonfield, Marlton, and Medford were flag stops.

=== Delaware River Railroad ===
The Delaware River Railroad (DRR) was incorporated on February 20, 1873, as the Delaware Shore Railroad to build a line from Woodbury to Penns Grove. The line was opened in July 1876, but declared bankruptcy in January 1879 and reincorporated as the DRR. On April 30, 1900, the WJ&S acquired the DRR. Conrail's Penns Grove Secondary operates along the right of way.

== Pennsylvania-Reading Seashore Lines ==
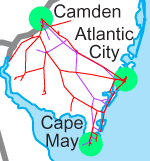
West Jersey and Seashore Railroad lines in red, Atlantic City Railroad lines in purple

The Pennsylvania Railroad formally leased the West Jersey and Seashore Railroad on July 1, 1930. The Pennsylvania Railroad and Reading Company agreed on November 2, 1932, to merge their operations in southern New Jersey. The vehicle for this merger was the Atlantic City Railroad, a Reading subsidiary established in 1901. The company was renamed the Pennsylvania-Reading Seashore Lines (PRSL), effective July 15, 1933, with two-thirds Pennsylvania and one-third Reading ownership. The Pennsylvania then assigned the lease of the West Jersey and Seashore Railroad to the new company. The West Jersey and Seashore Railroad continued to exist as a non-operating subsidiary and its assets were conveyed to Conrail in 1976.

== See also ==
- 1896 Atlantic City rail crash
- 1906 Atlantic City train wreck
- Central Railroad of New Jersey
- Glassboro station
- New Jersey Southern Railroad
- Railroad electrification in the United States
- Reading Company
