= Atsion branch =

Railway line in New Jersey

History
- Opened: September 1862
- Closed: 1910

Technical
- Line length: 9.3 mi (15.0 km)
- Track gauge: 1,435 mm (4 ft 8 1/2 in) standard gauge

The Atsion branch, also known as the Atco branch or Batsto branch, was a railway line in the state of New Jersey, in the United States. It ran from Atco, New Jersey, to Atsion, New Jersey, connecting the Williamstown Branch and the Atlantic City Line with the Southern Division of the Central Railroad of New Jersey. It was built by the Raritan and Delaware Bay Railroad under contract in 1862 and eventually became part of the Central Railroad of New Jersey system. It was abandoned in 1910.

== History ==
The Camden and Atlantic Railroad completed its main line between Camden, New Jersey, and Atlantic City, New Jersey, in June 1854. Its charter authorized a branch via Atsion, New Jersey, to Batsto, New Jersey, north of its main line. Nothing was undertaken until the Raritan and Delaware Bay Railroad began building toward Atsion in the early 1860s. The Camden and Atlantic contracted with the Raritan and Delaware Bay to construct a connection between the two lines.

The line was completed in September 1862 but was not conveyed to the Camden and Atlantic. The Camden and Amboy Railroad took legal action against the two railroads, claiming a legal monopoly on traffic between Philadelphia and New York City. A decision of the New Jersey Court of Errors and Appeals vindicated the Camden and Amboy on November 30, 1867, at which point operation of the line ceased. The branch was conveyed to the Raritan and Delaware Bay on February 16, 1870.

Coincident with the conveyance the Raritan and Delaware Bay was renamed the New Jersey Southern Railroad. That company was reorganized as the New Jersey Southern Railway on July 30, 1879. The Central Railroad of New Jersey gained control of that company and its lines on December 15, 1888, although a formal merger did not occur until October 16, 1917. The line was abandoned in 1910.
