= Williamstown and Delaware River Railroad =

Railway company in New Jersey

Overview
- Dates of operation: 1883–1889
- Predecessor: Williamstown Railroad
- Successor: Atlantic City Railroad

Technical
- Track gauge: 1,435 mm (4 ft 8 1/2 in)
- Length: 22 miles (35 km)

The Williamstown and Delaware River Railroad was a railway company in the United States. It was incorporated in 1883 to reorganize the bankrupt Williamstown Railroad under the control of the Philadelphia and Reading Railroad. The new company extended the original line from Williamstown, New Jersey, to Mullica Hill, New Jersey, via Glassboro, New Jersey. The company was consolidated with four other companies in 1889 to form the Atlantic City Railroad. None of the company's line remains.

== History ==
The Williamstown Railroad constructed a line between Williamstown, New Jersey, and Atco, New Jersey, which opened in 1872 and had a connection to the Camden and Atlantic Railroad near Atco. The company went bankrupt in 1881 and in 1883 was acquired by Philadelphia and Reading Railroad interests. The reorganized company was named the Williamstown and Delaware River Railroad, and incorporated on December 7, 1883.

The Williamstown Railroad had planned to build west to Glassboro, New Jersey, but lacked the resources. The Williamstown and Delaware River Railroad completed the extension in 1884. A further extension from Glassboro to Mullica Hill, New Jersey, was completed in 1888. The Williamstown and Delaware River Railroad was consolidated with the Philadelphia and Atlantic City Railroad, Glassboro Railroad, Camden, Gloucester and Mount Ephraim Railway, and Kaighn's Point Terminal Railroad on March 29, 1889, to form the Atlantic City Railroad, a predecessor of the Pennsylvania-Reading Seashore Lines.
