= Williamstown Railroad =

Railway company in New Jersey

Overview
- Dates of operation: 1861–1883
- Successor: Williamstown and Delaware River Railroad

Technical
- Track gauge: 1,435 mm (4 ft 8 1/2 in)
- Length: 9 miles (14 km)

The Williamstown Railroad was a railway company in the United States. It was incorporated in 1861 and began operating between Williamstown, New Jersey, and Atco, New Jersey, in 1874. It interchanged with the Camden and Atlantic Railroad in Atco. The company came under Philadelphia and Reading Railroad control in 1883 and was reorganized as the Williamstown and Delaware River Railroad. The company's line eventually passed to the Pennsylvania-Reading Seashore Lines and was abandoned between 1934 and 1942.

== History ==
The Williamstown Railroad was incorporated on March 13, 1861. It was to be constructed from Williamstown, New Jersey to a connection with either or both of the Camden and Atlantic Railroad, to the east, or the Millville and Glassboro Railroad, to the west. A supplement to its charter passed on January 25, 1866 allowed it to extend from Williamstown west to the Delaware River at Penns Grove, New Jersey, or some point within a mile of it. Construction had still not begun in 1870, when surveys and fundraising were taking place. In 1871, Samuel Garwood and John F. Bodine, owners of a glass works in Williamstown, began to push forward construction of the railroad to provide an outlet for their business. The company constructed a 9.5-mile (15.3 km) line from Williamstown to Atco, New Jersey, where it connected with the Camden and Atlantic. This line opened in October 1872. The line west of Williamstown was graded to Glassboro, New Jersey, but rails were only laid as far as Robanna, 1.7 miles (2.7 km) west of Williamstown and extension halted for the time being.

During Bodine's tenure as president and superintendent of the company, freight rates were adjusted for the benefit of the glassworks, with the railroad run as close as possible to breaking even. The Camden & Atlantic bought most of the railroad's bonds, probably at a heavy discount. In 1877, the 3 ft 6 in (1,067 mm) Philadelphia and Atlantic City Railway built a new line crossing the Williamstown Railroad at P&AC Junction, later Williamstown Junction, about 1.6 miles (2.6 km) west of Atco. Bodine's glass business was in decline in November 1881, when the Williamstown Railroad entered bankruptcy. On July 1, 1882, Bodine sold out his share in the glass works to Garwood and another partner, Charles E. Thomas.

The Philadelphia and Reading Railroad took control in October 1883, reorganized the company as the Williamstown and Delaware River Railroad, and completed the extension to Glassboro. The Reading-controlled 3 ft 6 in (1,067 mm) Philadelphia and Atlantic City Railway crossed the Williamstown at Williamstown Junction, about 1.6 miles (2.6 km) west of Atco. Once the Philadelphia and Atlantic City was converted to standard gauge in 1884 the importance of the Williamstown branch diminished. The Pennsylvania-Reading Seashore Lines abandoned the branch between Williamstown and Williamstown Junction in 1934 and between Williamstown Junction and Atco in 1942.
