= 1922 Winslow Junction train derailment =

Train wreck in New York City

Coordinates: 39.7199°N 74.9053°W

The 1922 Winslow Junction train derailment was a July 2, 1922 accident on the Atlantic City Railroad. Train No. 33, "The Owl", going 90 miles (140 km) per hour on its scheduled run from Camden to Atlantic City (with ferry connection from Philadelphia), sped through an open switch at Winslow Junction. Seven were killed and 89 were injured.

== Accident ==
The accident occurred on July 2, 1922, shortly before 11:30pm on the Atlantic City Railroad's Camden to Atlantic City Line, in Winslow, New Jersey at Winslow Junction near the WA Tower. Train No. 33, "The Owl", with Philadelphia and Reading Railway Eng. No. 349 derailed. The train was going approximately 90 miles (140 km) per hour as it sped through an open switch. The derailment of train No. 33 resulted in most of the 6-car Atlantic City express (consisting of 1 forward coach, 1 pullman parlor car, 3 coaches & a combine car) plunging down an embankment into the WJ&S's southbound Cape May branch connecting track. This resulted in the death of three passengers, three employees, and one Pullman porter, and the injury of 84 passengers and five employees.

== Investigation ==
The Interstate Commerce Commission investigation found that the route could have been changed after the train had passed the distant signal at the plant was not interlocked, but there was no evidence that this had been done. The report further stated that the engineer failed to acknowledge the junction by blowing the whistle and attempting to stop the train.

=== From the ICC report ===
"This accident was caused by failure of Engineman Wescott of train No. 33 to be governed by automatic and interlocking signal indications, which resulted in train No. 33 taking the diverging route at a high rate of speed and being derailed due to the outer rail of the curve giving way."

== See also ==
- Atlantic City Railroad
- Reading Company
- Pennsylvania–Reading Seashore Lines

== Bibliography ==
- Cook, W. George; Coxey, William J. (1980). Atlantic City Railroad: The Royal Route To The Sea. Palmyra, New Jersey: West Jersey Chapter, National Railway Historical Society. pp. 123–124.
- Gladulich, Richard M. (1986). By rail to the boardwalk. Glendale, California: Trans Anglo Books. ISBN 0-87046-076-5.
