= Pleasantville and Ocean City Railroad =

Former railroad company in New Jersey

Overview
- Parent company: Philadelphia and Atlantic City Railway (1880–1882); West Jersey Railroad (1882)
- Dates of operation: 1880–1882
- Successor: West Jersey and Atlantic Railroad

Technical
- Track gauge: 3 ft 6 in (1,067 mm)
- Length: 7.0 miles (11.3 km)

The Pleasantville and Ocean City Railroad was a railway company in the United States. It was incorporated in 1880 by the Philadelphia and Atlantic City Railway, then in bankruptcy, to construct a branch between Pleasantville and Somers Point, New Jersey. The line opened in 1880. The company was sold in 1882 to the West Jersey Railroad and merged into the West Jersey and Atlantic Railroad.

== History ==
The Philadelphia and Atlantic City Railway (P&AC) was established in 1876 to compete with the Camden and Atlantic Railroad. The company opened a 3 ft 6 in (1,067 mm) narrow gauge line between Camden and Atlantic City in 1877. The company was not a success and entered receivership in 1878, a year after beginning operation.

The bankruptcy trustees incorporated the Pleasantville and Ocean City Railroad on June 7, 1880, to construct a branch south from Pleasantville to Somers Point, across Great Egg Harbor Bay from Ocean City. They hoped to generate additional business for the P&AC, but incorporated separately to limit its liability. William Massey was elected president and construction began on July 2. The line opened on October 26, 1880. Passengers used a ferry to reach Ocean City from Somers Point. The new railroad owned one coach and one combine, but the P&AC operated all of its services.

The P&AC continued to experience difficulties and Massey sold his interest in the Pleasantville and Ocean City Railroad to associates of the West Jersey Railroad in May 1882. The West Jersey's subsidiary, the West Jersey and Atlantic Railroad had built its own line to Atlantic City in June 1880, crossing the Pleasantville and Ocean City just southeast of its junction with the P&AC. The new board of the Pleasantville and Ocean City agreed to sell their railroad to the West Jersey and Atlantic on June 4, 1882. The West Jersey immediately converted the line to standard gauge; the company was formally merged into the West Jersey and Atlantic Railroad on December 8. The 0.36 miles (0.58 km) of track continuing to the P&AC were removed, while the two passenger cars remained in service on the P&AC.
