= Camden, Gloucester and Mount Ephraim Railway =

Overview
- Dates of operation: 1873–1889
- Successor: Atlantic City Railroad

Technical
- Track gauge: 1,435 mm (4 ft 8 1/2 in)
- Previous gauge: 3 ft (914 mm)
- Length: 5 miles (8.0 km)

The Camden, Gloucester and Mount Ephraim Railway was a railway company in the United States. It was incorporated in 1873 and began operating between Camden, New Jersey, and Gloucester City, New Jersey, in 1874. An extension to Mount Ephraim, New Jersey, opened in 1876. The company's lines were 3 ft (914 mm) narrow gauge; after the Philadelphia and Reading Railroad gained control in 1885 it was converted to standard gauge. The company was consolidated with four other companies in 1889 to form the Atlantic City Railroad. Part of the company's line between Gloucester City and Mount Ephraim remains in use.

== History ==
The Camden, Gloucester and Mount Ephraim Railway was incorporated on June 17, 1873. The backers were Gloucester City, New Jersey, businessmen, who sought to establish a link between that city and Camden, New Jersey. From Camden, passengers could use existing ferries to cross the Delaware River to Philadelphia.

The line was built using a 3 ft (914 mm) gauge and opened on February 14, 1874. It ran 3.86 miles (6.21 km), from the ferry at Kaighn's Point in Camden on the Delaware River across Newton Creek to Gloucester City. A 1.2-mile (1.9 km) extension from Gloucester City to Mount Ephraim, New Jersey, opened in May 1876. (Note: Coverdale & Colpitts and the ICC valuation report give the overall length of the railroad as 3.86 miles (6.21 km) and do not report any construction in 1876.)

The Philadelphia and Reading Railway acquired stock control of the Camden, Gloucester and Mount Ephraim Railway in 1884 and took steps to coordinate its operations with that of the Philadelphia and Atlantic City Railroad, a 3 ft 6 in (1,067 mm) railroad running between Camden and Atlantic City, New Jersey. The Reading converted the Philadelphia and Atlantic City Railroad to standard gauge on October 5–6, 1884. The Camden, Gloucester and Mount Ephraim Railway followed on June 21, 1885. A connection was built to allow Philadelphia and Atlantic City Railway trains to reach the ferry at Kaighn's Point.

The Camden, Gloucester and Mount Ephraim Railway was consolidated with the Philadelphia and Atlantic City Railroad, Glassboro Railroad, Williamstown and Delaware River Railroad, and Kaighn's Point Terminal Railroad on March 29, 1889, to form the Atlantic City Railroad.
