= Atsion Mansion =

- U.S. Historic district – Contributing property
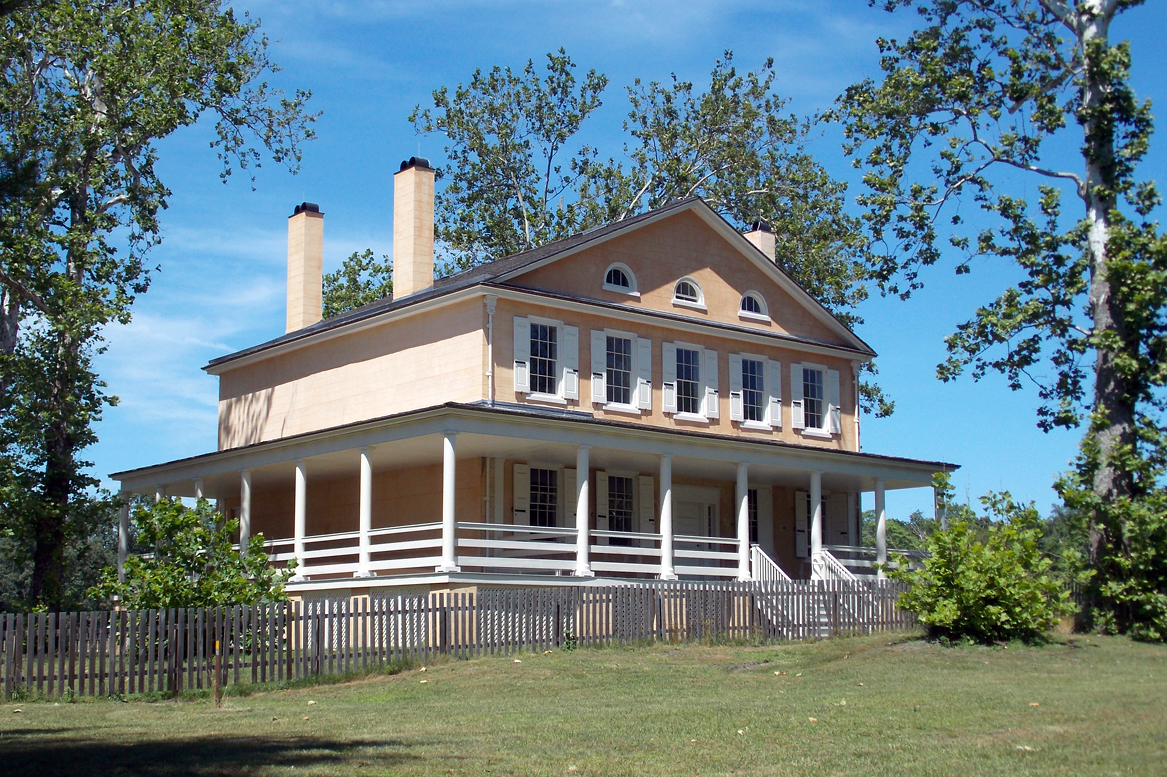
- Atsion Mansion in 2012

- Location within Burlington County, New Jersey Location within New Jersey Location within the United States
- Location: 744 U.S. Route 206, Shamong Township, New Jersey
- Coordinates: 39°44′33″N 74°43′34″W
- Built: 1824–1826
- Architect: Unknown
- Architectural style: Greek Revival
- Part of: Atsion Village (ID74001154)
- Designated CP: October 27, 1974

Atsion Mansion is a country estate in the former ironworking community of Atsion in Shamong Township, New Jersey. The estate is one of the finest examples of Vernacular Greek Revival architecture in the state of New Jersey.

The home was built by Samuel Richards, a wealthy and influential ironmaster from Philadelphia, Pennsylvania, who operated the nearby Atsion Iron Furnace & Forge until his death in 1842.

The mansion is currently under the management of the New Jersey Department of Environmental Protection in Wharton State Forest, with tours usually being held every Saturday & Sunday at 1pm & 2pm.

== History ==
An iron forge at Atsion was established between June 1765 and January 1766 by Charles Read, a businessman in the Province of New Jersey prior to the American Revolutionary War. Read was engaged in an ambitious project to establish a network of ironworks in the New Jersey Pine Barrens consisting of Atsion Forge, Batsto Furnace, Aetna Furnace in Medford and Taunton Forge in Medford Lakes, but became financially overextended. He sold a 25% interest in Atsion to David Ogden Jr. and 25% to Lawrence Saltar in 1766. Read sold out his remaining 50% interest in 1773 to Abel James and Henry Drinker, while Ogden sold his shares to Saltar, who would operate the forge in partnership with James and Drinker. The three partners, all Quaker merchants, constructed an iron furnace in June 1774 to make pig iron at the forge, which until then had been supplied by Batsto furnace. The outbuildings for the furnace burned down in September 1794 but were quickly rebuilt. The ironworks and surrounding village were sold to Jacob Downing, Drinker's son-in-law, in 1805, but the business declined after 1815, and the ironworks were abandoned by 1823, when it became the property of Samuel Richards in December 1824.

Richards repaired and reopened the ironworks in 1824. Around this time, the mansion had begun the process of construction on the site of an older home built by Lawrence Saltar. Construction of the mansion was completed in May 1826. The date of completion is evidenced by the year on four cast iron downspouts on the exterior of the mansion.

Richards had the mansion completed as a summer residence for his family, with their main residence being located on Arch Street in Philadelphia. Richards would also use the home to entertain other family members and guests from Philadelphia or the surrounding area.

Richards died on January 4, 1842, in Philadelphia. Iron production continued at Atsion until 1851, when the iron furnace was demolished to make way for the construction of a paper mill by Richards' son-in-law, William Walton Fleming. The family would continue to use the mansion as a residence until 1855, when members of the immediate family moved to Brussels, Belgium after Fleming had fled the country to escape his creditors and financial ruin. The mansion was put up for rent in April 1855.

The property was passed down through differing owners. In July 1861, the property fell into the ownership of William C. Patterson, younger brother of Robert Patterson. Patterson then sold it to Philadelphia businessman, Maurice Raleigh, in 1871. During his tenure, Raleigh converted and expanded the old Fleming paper mill into a cotton mill. Following Raleigh's death in 1882, the property was left to his heirs, who did not maintain it. The Raleigh's were the last ones to use the mansion as a residence. In March 1892, Joseph Wharton purchased the lands at Atsion as a part of his 96,000 acre holdings in the New Jersey Pine Barrens, and converted the mansion into a storage facility for cranberry and peanut harvesting. Following Wharton's death in 1909, the mansion sat vacant until 1955 when the State of New Jersey purchased the Wharton Tract and established Wharton State Forest in 1956.

The mansion underwent a 1962 restoration campaign by G. Edwin Brumbaugh, son of former Pennsylvania governor Martin Grove Brumbaugh. The 1962 campaign restored the exterior facades and porches to the original 1826 configuration. Interior stabilization was undertaken during this campaign.

A full restoration of the mansion was undertaken from 2007 to 2009 with an estimated price of $1.2 million, which included further restoration to the exterior, a full interior restoration, and the addition of the western porch which had been removed during the Brumbaugh restoration campaign.

== Exterior ==
The exterior of the mansion features a patterned stucco scoring over an ironstone core, intended to replicate marble blocks. Evidence suggests the original color of the mansion was white, to resemble a Greek temple, to match with the Greek Revival architecture of the structure. An L-shaped verandah porch wraps around the south and western sides of the mansion. The south porch was part of the original 1826 construction, with the western porch added on between 1828-1830. The porch is supported by 13 cast-iron columns that were cast at the Weymouth Iron Works in Weymouth Township, New Jersey, another iron furnace operated by Richards.

== Interior ==
The interior of the mansion is divided into twenty rooms on four floors. The first floor contains a large central hallway that runs the entire length of the structure from north to south, flanked by double parlors on the western side. The eastern side contains a stair hall, with a dining room and butlers pantry on either side. The western and eastern side of the mansion contain no windows, with the exception of one on the eastern side to provide illumination into the stair hall.

The second floor contains six bedrooms all used by members of the Richards family connected with a central hallway running east to west. Two rooms, closest to the stairs, were believed to have been used by the eldest Richards children. Two middle rooms are believed to have been used by the youngest of the Richards children. Two rooms at the end of the hall are believed to have been the master bedrooms used by Samuel Richards and his wife. Both rooms are connected with a central closet to give them a "Jack and Jill" styled orientation.

The third floor contains four bedrooms that would have been used as livable space for the servant staff. Each room has access to fresh air and ventilation through the lunette windows located on this level.

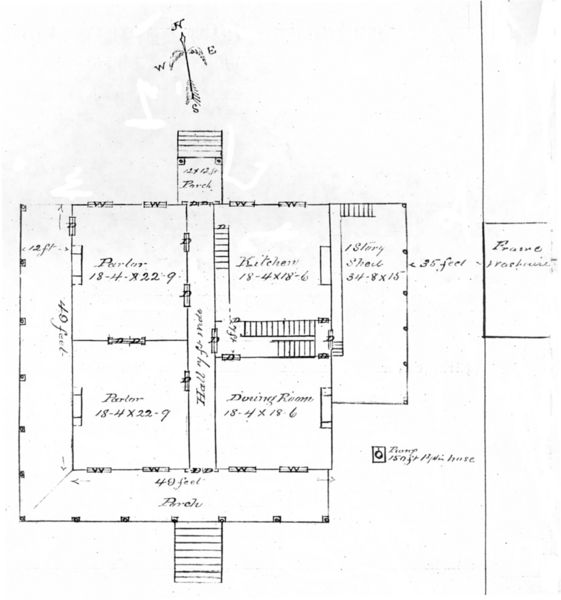
A Fire Insurance Survey conducted on the Atsion Mansion for William C. Patterson in December 1869.

The basement contains a cooking kitchen, fitted with a 6-foot hearth and built-in oven for bread. A wine cellar, ice room, servant dining room, and root cellar are all located in this level of the mansion.
