= Rutherford Intermodal Yard =

Rail yard in Swatara Township, Pennsylvania, U.S.

Coordinates: 40.262°N 76.785°W

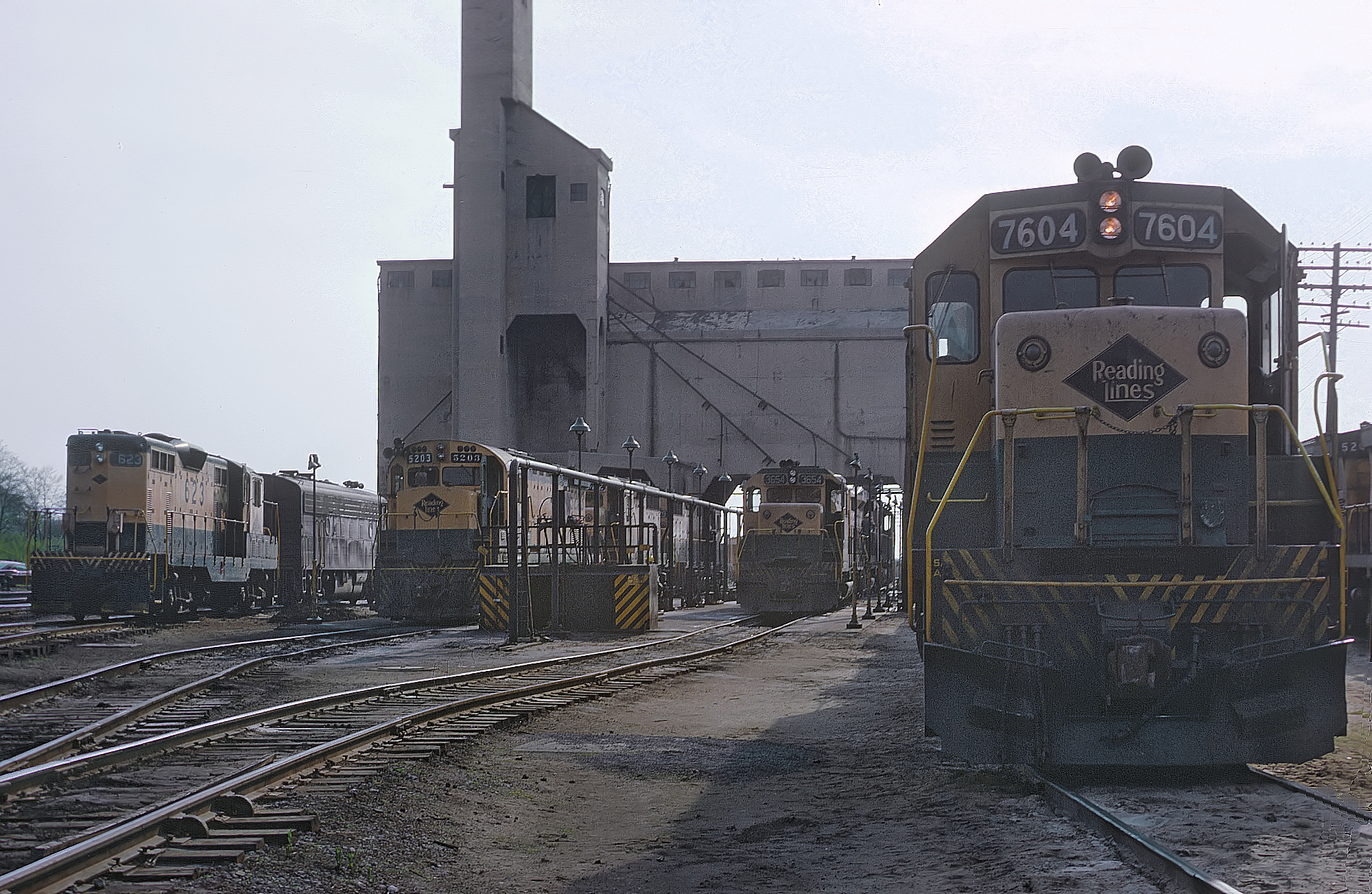
Rutherford Yard in 1970 when it was operated by Reading Railroad

Rutherford Intermodal Yard is a large rail yard located in Swatara Township, Dauphin County, just east of Harrisburg, Pennsylvania.

== History ==
The yard was formerly operated by the Reading Railroad and later Conrail. Ownership was transferred from Conrail to the Norfolk Southern Railway in 1999. In the summer of 2000, Norfolk Southern retrofitted the yard for $31 million, its first major investment in the Harrisburg area. Large cargo containers are transferred at the yard from flatbed truck trailers to flatbed rail cars, or vice versa. The Rutherford facility has 14 classification tracks, seven loading/unloading tracks, two overhead cranes, and parking space for 600 trailers.

== See also ==
- Harrisburg Line
