= King Coal (train) =

Overview
- Service type: Inter-city rail
- Status: Discontinued
- Locale: Pennsylvania
- First service: Late 1930s
- Last service: June 28, 1963
- Former operator: Reading Railroad

Route
- Termini: Philadelphia, Pennsylvania; Shamokin, Pennsylvania

The King Coal was a passenger train operated by the Reading Railroad between Philadelphia and Shamokin, Pennsylvania. The train was launched in the late 1930s, as part of Reading's introduction of streamlined trains, with equipment rebuilt by the railroad specifically for the service.

In its latter years it was truncated to Pottsville on weekends. Due to declining demand for passenger rail travel as automobiles became more prevalent, the King Coal was discontinued on June 28, 1963.
