= Atlantic City Railroad =

Railway subsidiary in Pennsylvania, US

Overview
- Headquarters: Camden, New Jersey, U.S.
- Locale: Camden and Winslow Junction, New Jersey, to Atlantic City and Ocean City and Cape May
- Dates of operation: 1889–1933
- Successor: Pennsylvania-Reading Seashore Lines

Technical
- Track gauge: 4 ft 8 1/2 in (1,435 mm) standard gauge

The Atlantic City Railroad was a Philadelphia and Reading Railway subsidiary that became part of Pennsylvania-Reading Seashore Lines in 1933. At the end of 1925, it operated 161 miles (259 km) of road on 318 miles (512 km) of track; that year it reported 43 million ton-miles of revenue freight and 204 million passenger-miles.

== History ==
Effective 1 April 1889, the Philadelphia and Reading Railway consolidated all of its railroads in Southern New Jersey into the Atlantic City Railroad.

=== Speed records ===
On 20 July 1904, the regularly scheduled train no. 25, which ran from Kaighn's Point in Camden, New Jersey, to Atlantic City, New Jersey, with Philadelphia and Reading Railway class P-4c 4-4-2 No.334 and 5 passenger cars, set a speed record. It ran the 55.5 miles (89.3 km) in 43 minutes at an average speed of 77.4 mph (124.6 km/h). The 29.3 miles (47.2 km) between Winslow Jct and Meadows Tower (outside of Atlantic City) were covered in 20 minutes at a speed of 87.9 mph (141.5 km/h). During the short segment between Egg Harbor and Brigantine Jct, the train was reported to have reached 115 mph (185 km/h).

== Predecessor railroads ==
=== Camden, Gloucester and Mount Ephraim Railway ===
Incorporated on 17 June 1873 by a group from Gloucester City, which wanted a rail line to link the busy passenger ferry landing at Kaighn's Point in Camden to the Gloucester City industrial area 3.9 miles (6.3 km) away, then from that point another 1.3 miles (2.1 km) to Mount Ephraim Borough.

A 3 ft (914 mm) narrow gauge was required, as much of the right of way used existing city streets with sharp curves. Work began in January 1874 and the line from Kaighn's Point to Gloucester City opened on 14 February 1874. The line to Mount Ephraim Borough opened in May 1876. In mid-November 1884, the Philadelphia and Reading Railway gained control of the Camden, Gloucester and Mt Ephraim Railway. The lines were converted to 4 ft 8 1/2 in (1,435 mm) standard gauge in 1885.

=== Philadelphia and Atlantic City Railway ===
During 1875, four of the Camden and Atlantic (C&A) Board of Directors, led by Samuel Richards (an officer of the C&A for 24 years) left to build a second railroad from Camden, New Jersey, to Atlantic City by way of Clementon. It was incorporated on 24 March 1876. A 3 ft 6 in (1,067 mm) track gauge was selected because narrow gauge was successful at the time and saved in lower operating cost. Work began in April 1877. The track work was completed in 90 days. On 7 July 1877, the final spike was driven and the 54.67-mile (87.98 km) line was opened. On 12 July 1878, the P&AC RY slipped into bankruptcy. The Philadelphia and Atlantic City Railway was acquired by the CNJ and the Philadelphia and Reading Railway for $1,000,000 on 20 September 1883. The name was modified to Philadelphia and Atlantic City Railroad effective 4 December 1883. The first task was to convert the line to 4 ft 8 1/2 in (1,435 mm) standard gauge, which was completed on 5 October 1884. The Philadelphia and Reading Railway acquired full control on 4 December 1885.

=== Williamstown and Delaware River Railroad ===
The Williamstown and Delaware River Railroad was incorporated in 1883 to reorganize the bankrupt Williamstown Railroad, which owned a line between Williamstown, New Jersey, and Atco, New Jersey. The reorganized Williamstown and Delaware River Railroad extended the Williamstown Branch to Glassboro in 1883–1884 and then Mullica Hill, New Jersey, in 1888, for a total length of 22 miles (35 kilometers).

== Cultural context ==
At the end of the nineteenth century and the early decades of the twentieth century, railroads were primary channels for accessing New Jersey shore beaches. PRR property railroads carried beachgoers from Philadelphia and Camden.

1915 Pennsylvania Railroad publication touting New Jersey and Delmarva peninsula beaches.

== Railroads acquired in 1901 ==
The Atlantic City Railroad was reincorporated on 14 June 1901 as a merger with other railroads......

=== Camden County Railroad ===
The Camden County Railroad was incorporated on 17 September 1889 with the purpose of extending the ACRR's Gloucester Branch ex Camden, Gloucester & Mt Ephraim Railway between Mount Ephraim Borough and Spring Mills, home of the Bateman Manufacturing Company where two plants were in use constructing farm equipment. As of 31 December 1890, 5 miles of railroad were completed south of Mt. Ephraim. The remaining 2.19 miles were finished on 10 May 1891. Spring Mills saw its first train during the third week in March, while the first carload of farm equipment and tools did not leave Bateman Manufacturing until the beginning of April. Stations were constructed along the Camden County Railroad at Bellmawr, Runnemede, Glendora, Chews Landing formerly South Glendora, Blenheim, Blackwood, and Spring Mills, renamed Grenloch (in Gloucester Township, New Jersey ) upon completion of the line. After construction was complete, the Camden County Railroad, which had been established with the sole purpose of constructing this extension, was leased to the Atlantic City Railroad. Atlantic City Railroad Timetable No. 3, effective 14 April 1892, was the first to show trains operating on the Gloucester Branch between Mt. Ephraim and Grenloch.

- ACRR Gloucester Branch
- P-RSL Grenloch Branch

=== Cape May, Delaware Bay and Sewell's Point Railroad ===
This particular line existed from 1863 until the 1920s, and ran from Sunset Beach in Lower Township, around the Point to South Cape May (now known as South Meadows), into Cape May City, out to Sewell's Point (now the Coast Guard Training Center), and back around to Schellenger's Landing, where visitors could then connect to Philadelphia-bound trains.

=== Ocean City Railroad ===
Ocean City Junction to Ocean City

=== Seacoast Railroad ===
Winslow Junction to Tuckahoe, Sea Isle City and Cape May

== Railroads acquired in the 1930s ==
=== Stone Harbor Railroad ===
Acquired in April 1932, the SHRR ran from Cape May Court House to Stone Harbor; it was merged with the PRSL in 1936.

=== Wildwood and Delaware Bay Short Line Railroad ===
Acquired in July 1930, the W&DBSLRR ran from Wildwood Junction to Wildwood; it was merged with the ACRR (by then PRSL) in 1934.

== Railroads operated or leased ==
=== Pleasantville & Ocean City Railroad ===
On 9 June 1880, Pleasantville & Ocean City Railroad incorporated in New Jersey, with William Massey as president (Val). On 26 October, Pleasantville & Ocean City Railroad (3 ft 6 in / 1,067 mm narrow-gauge) opened between Pleasantville and Somers Point, NJ, operated by Philadelphia & Atlantic City Railway. The opening excursion ran from Philadelphia to Ocean City. The Ocean City Association operated connecting steamboat between Somers Point and Ocean City. (Val, Lee)

In May 1882, William Massey sold the Pleasantville & Ocean City Railroad to the West Jersey and Atlantic Railroad. On 1 June, the West Jersey and Atlantic Railroad leased the Pleasantville & Ocean City Railroad and converted to 4 ft 8 1/2 in (1,435 mm) standard gauge began on 4 June.

=== Brigantine Railroads ===
On 7 August 1889, Brigantine Beach Railroad incorporated in New Jersey to build from Pomona on the Camden and Atlantic Railroad to Brigantine Island.

On 21 April 1890, Pomona Beach Railroad incorporated in New Jersey to build from Camden and Atlantic Railroad to the Atlantic City Railroad at Pomona, to connect the Brigantine Beach Railroad with the ACRR. On 18 August, the Brigantine Beach Railroad and Pomona Beach Railroad were leased to Atlantic City Railroad.

On 27 January 1891, Pomona Beach Railroad consolidated with Brigantine Beach Railroad, now running 13.9 miles (22.4 km) from Brigantine Beach to Brigantine Junction..

In 1893, the Brigantine Transit Company was built as an electric trolley line. The road extended along Brigantine Beach NJ a distance of 6.25 miles (10.06 km)

On 27 June 1895, George H Cook, the secretary of Brigantine Transit Company, bought the Brigantine Beach Railroad at foreclosure sale.

On 1 April 1896, the Brigantine Beach Railroad reincorporated as Philadelphia & Brigantine Railroad with George H. Cook as president. The Philadelphia & Brigantine Railroad leased the Brigantine Transit Company.

On 30 September 1897, Atlantic City Railroad canceled the lease of Philadelphia & Brigantine Railroad.

On 12 September 1903, a storm destroyed trestle leading to Brigantine Island on Philadelphia & Brigantine Railroad. (Coxey) On 9 October, the Philadelphia & Brigantine Railroad abandoned all service. (Coxey)

== Pennsylvania-Reading Seashore Lines ==
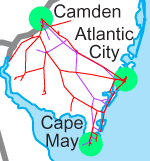
Map of the consolidated Pennsylvania-Reading lines (West Jersey and Seashore Railroad lines in red, Atlantic City Railroad lines in purple)

On 2 November 1932, the Pennsylvania Railroad and Reading Company joined their southern New Jersey railroad lines into one company, The Pennsylvania-Reading Seashore Lines which the Pennsylvania Railroad had a 2/3 ownership, And the Reading Company had a 1/3 ownership.

On 15 July 1933, The Atlantic City Railroad leased the West Jersey & Seashore Railroad and changed its name to Pennsylvania-Reading Seashore Lines.

== See also ==
- Central Railroad of New Jersey
- New Jersey Southern Railroad
- Pennsylvania Railroad
- Reading Company
- 1896 Atlantic City rail crash
- 1922 Winslow Junction Train Derailment
