= Williamstown Branch =

History
- Opened: October 1872
- Closed: October 1, 1969

Technical
- Line length: 22 mi (35 km)

The Williamstown Branch was a railway line in the state of New Jersey, in the United States. It ran 22 miles (35 km) from Atco, New Jersey, to Mullica Hill, New Jersey, via Williamstown, New Jersey. It was built between 1861 and 1888 by the Williamstown Railroad and Williamstown and Delaware River Railroad. It became part of the Philadelphia and Reading Railroad system in 1883 and was abandoned in 1969.

== History ==
The Williamstown Railroad completed a 9-mile (14 km) line between Williamstown, New Jersey, and Atco, New Jersey, in October 1872. In Atco it connected with the main line of the Camden and Atlantic Railroad. The company planned to build west to Glassboro, New Jersey, but lacked the resources Philadelphia and Reading Railroad interests reorganized the company as the Williamstown and Delaware River Railroad and promptly extended the line to Glassboro. Another company, the Glassboro Railroad, constructed a .34-mile (0.55 km) extension into Glassboro proper in 1884. A further extension from Glassboro to Mullica Hill, New Jersey, was completed in 1888.

The Williamstown and Delaware River Railroad and Glassboro Railroad were consolidated with the Philadelphia and Atlantic City Railroad, Camden, Gloucester and Mount Ephraim Railway, and Kaighn's Point Terminal Railroad on March 29, 1889, to form the Atlantic City Railroad. Passenger service between Glassboro and Mullica Hill ended in April 1929. In the 1930s the Reading Company and Pennsylvania Railroad agreed to merge their operations in South Jersey. The Atlantic City Railroad was renamed the Pennsylvania-Reading Seashore Lines (PRSL), effective July 15, 1933, with two-thirds Pennsylvania and one-third Reading ownership.

As part of the post-merger rationalization the Pennsylvania-Reading Seashore Lines abandoned the line between Williamstown and Williamstown Junction and the extension into Glassboro in 1934. It further abandoned the line between Williamstown Junction and Atco in 1942. The line between Glassboro and Mullica Hill was abandoned in December 1950. Except for some yard tracks within Glassboro, the remainder of the line between Glassboro and Williamstown was abandoned on October 1, 1969.
