= Philadelphia and Atlantic City Railway =

Railway company in New Jersey

- Philadelphia and Atlantic City Railroad

Overview
- Parent company: Philadelphia and Reading Railroad (1883–1889)
- Dates of operation: 1876–1889
- Successor: Atlantic City Railroad

Technical
- Track gauge: 1,435 mm (4 ft 8 1/2 in)
- Previous gauge: 3 ft 6 in (1,067 mm)
- Length: 54.5 miles (87.7 km)

The Philadelphia and Atlantic City Railway, later known as the Philadelphia and Atlantic City Railroad, was a railway company in the United States. It was incorporated in 1876 as a direct competitor to the Camden and Atlantic Railroad. It completed a 3 ft 6 in (1,067 mm) narrow gauge line between Camden, New Jersey, and Atlantic City, New Jersey, in 1877. The company was financially troubled and taken over by the Philadelphia and Reading Railroad in 1883. The reorganized company was consolidated with four other companies in 1889 to form the Atlantic City Railroad.

== History ==
The Camden and Atlantic Railroad completed the first railway line between Camden, New Jersey, and Atlantic City, New Jersey, on July 4, 1854. By the mid-1870s the railroad was successful enough to develop competition, and the Philadelphia and Atlantic City Railway was incorporated on March 24, 1876. Its backers included several former Camden and Atlantic directors. The company opted for a 3 ft 6 in (1,067 mm) narrow gauge in the belief that it would be cheaper to build and operate. The 54.5-mile (87.7 km) line opened on July 25, 1877. Inauspiciously, the first train derailed, killing a brakeman and injuring ten passengers.

The new company was not a success. Its gauge limited its interchange opportunities, it had little online freight traffic, and its fortunes depended drawing off passengers from the parallel Camden and Atlantic. The company entered receivership not quite a year after it opened, on July 13, 1878. The company continued operating, and in 1880 established the Pleasantville and Ocean City Railroad to construct a branch from Pleasantville, New Jersey, to Somers Point, New Jersey. That company was sold to the West Jersey Railroad (which was affiliated with the Pennsylvania Railroad) on June 4, 1882.

An attempt by the Camden and Atlantic to acquire its rival foundered on shareholder opposition. The Pennsylvania Railroad took control of the Camden and Atlantic on January 1, 1883. Concerned about access to Atlantic City, the Philadelphia and Reading Railroad took control of the Philadelphia and Atlantic City on October 31, 1883. The Reading reorganized the company as the Philadelphia and Atlantic City Railroad. The line was converted to standard gauge on October 5–6, 1884. The Philadelphia and Atlantic City Railroad was consolidated with the Camden, Gloucester and Mount Ephraim Railway, Glassboro Railroad, Williamstown and Delaware River Railroad, and Kaighn's Point Terminal Railroad, on March 29, 1889, to form the Atlantic City Railroad.
