= Atsion, New Jersey =

Populated place in Burlington County, New Jersey, US

- Unincorporated community
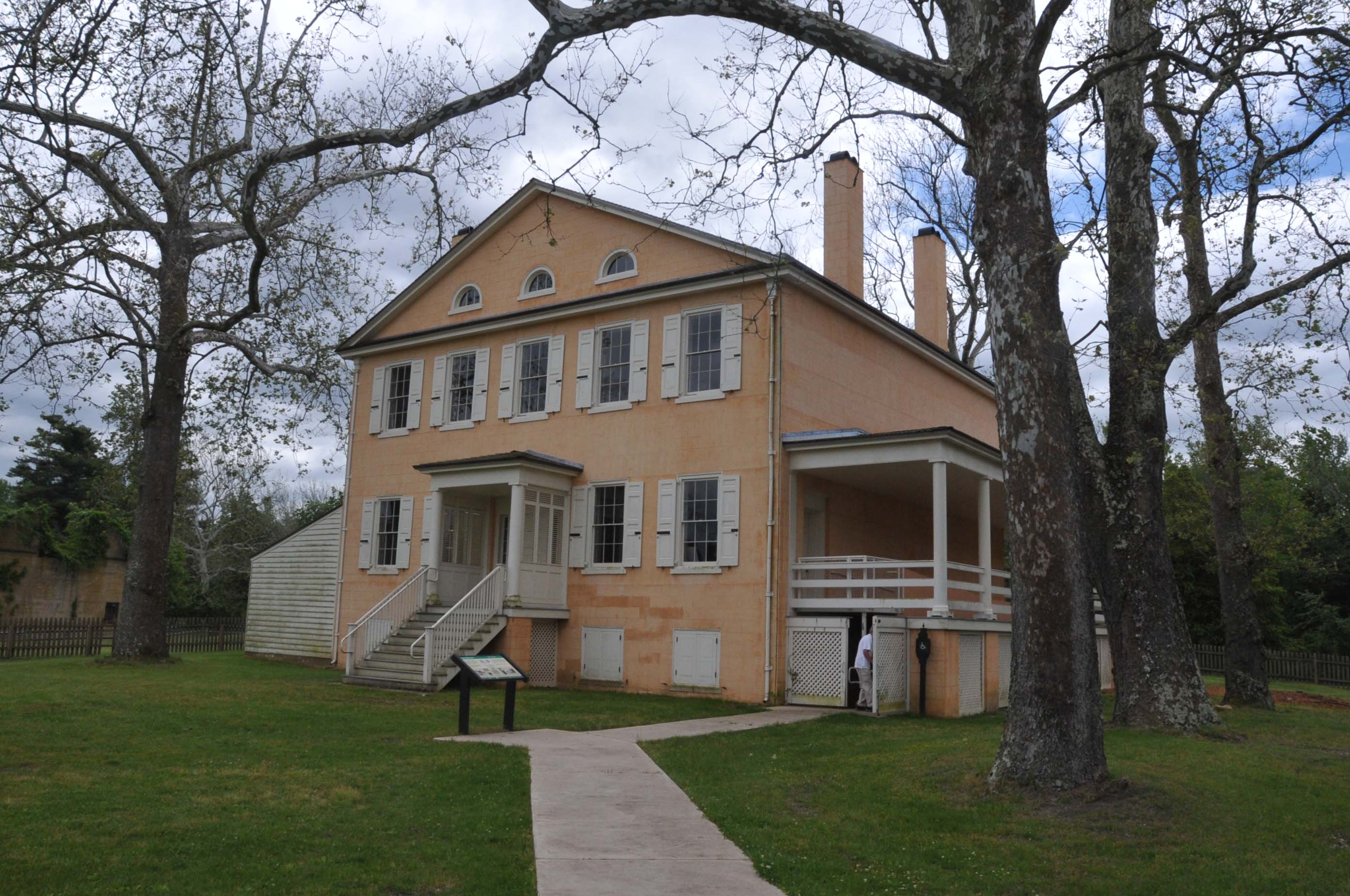
- Samuel Richards Mansion in Atsion

- Location within Burlington County, New Jersey Location within New Jersey Location within the United States
- Coordinates: 39°44′33″N 74°43′34″W
- Country: United States
- State: New Jersey
- County: Burlington
- Township: Shamong
- Elevation: 49 ft (15 m)
- Time zone: UTC−05:00 (Eastern (EST))
  - Summer (DST): UTC−04:00 (EDT)
- GNIS feature ID: 874418

Atsion is an unincorporated community located within Shamong Township in Burlington County, in the U.S. state of New Jersey. The community is located next to Atsion Lake.

The settlement is located within the Wharton State Forest, and a forest office, parking area and information kiosk are located at Atsion.

== History ==
Charles Read, an agriculturalist and industrialist from Burlington, New Jersey, established an iron forge at Atsion between June 29, 1765 and January 9, 1766. The forge was supplied with pig iron from the Batsto Furnace downstream, which Read had erected in 1766. By 1770, Read had put up his half share of the forge for sale, facing financial difficulties from his other ironworking sites at Batsto Furnace, Aetna Furnace, and Taunton Forge.

Read was finally able to sell his shares in Atsion to three Quakers from Philadelphia on March 16, 1773. The men, Henry Drinker, Abel James, and Lawrence Saltar erected an iron furnace on the site in June 1774, making Atsion self-sufficient from the Batsto Furnace. During the American Revolutionary War, the management of the iron works was divided between Drinker, who shut down the furnace throughout the duration of the war, with James and Saltar operating the forge throughout the war. The forge produced 170 camp kettles for the Continental Army in addition to iron of unknown type to the Pennsylvania Navy. At the end of the war, the furnace was reopened where the works continued producing pig iron, kettles, stoves, and other household or domestic goods. At the end of September 1794, a fire destroyed the outbuildings of the iron furnace, hampering much of the production going into the 1795 season.

The property was put up for sale in 1805 in which it contained both a cold-blast and hot-blast furnace, the forge which consisted of four fires and two forge hammers, a large ironmasters dwelling, a sawmill and two gristmills consisting of 20,000 acres of land. The buyer, Jacob Downing, was Henry Drinker's son-in-law who took title of the property that year. The establishment of a post office in August 1797 suggests that the community was flourishing at the time Jacob Downing took ownership of the property. By 1815, the iron works and community were beginning to decline, evidenced by the post office being moved to Sooy's Inn located in Southampton Township.

By 1823, the village had fallen into disrepair and ruin, with historian John Fanning Watson writing that year;

"Was much interested to see the formidable ruins of Atsion iron works, (27½ miles). They looked as picturesque as the ruins of abbeys in pictures. There were dams, forges, furnaces, storehouses, a dozen houses and lots for the men, and the whole comprising a town; a place once overwhelming the ear with the din of unceasing ponderous hammers, or alarming the sight with fire and smoke, and smutty and sweating Vulcans. Now, all is hushed; no wheels turn, no fires blaze, the houses are unroofed, and the frames have fallen down, and not a foot of the busy workmen is seen."

In December 1824, Samuel Richards, a Philadelphia ironmaster, purchased the entirety of the Atsion property from the estates of Drinker and Downing. His father and brother, William Richards and Jesse Richards, had become owners of the Batsto property in 1784 and 1809, respectively. When Richards purchased the Atsion property, he combined it with his West Mills & Hampton Tracts, forming one Atsion Tract which consisted of 60,000 acres. During the management of Richards, the combined operations of the furnace and forge produced up to 900 tons of iron per year, with the community encompassing 100 employees and 700 people. Atsion iron products became a regular sight at the "Atsion Wharf" located on the Rancocas Creek in Lumberton, New Jersey. The schooner "Atsion" was launched at Batsto in 1836, which allowed products being crafted at Atsion to be transported to cities such as Philadelphia, Albany, New York City, Troy, Poughkeepsie, and New Orleans. Richards would establish his country seat at Atsion, when he completed his mansion in 1826. Richards also established a new general store in 1827, and a non-denominational church in 1828.

Richards passed away on January 4, 1842 at his home in Philadelphia. His will stated that the Atsion property was to be divided in half between the two children from his second marriage, Maria and William.

== Historic district ==
- Atsion Village
- U.S. National Register of Historic Places
- U.S. Historic district
- New Jersey Register of Historic Places
- Location: U.S. Route 206 at Atsion & Quaker Bridge Roads
- Area: 703 acres (284 ha)
- Built: 1765
- Built by: Charles Read, Henry Drinker, Samuel Richards
- NRHP reference No.: 74001154
- NJRHP No.: 866

Significant dates
- Added to NRHP: October 22, 1974
- Designated NJRHP: September 11, 1970

Atsion Village is a historic district encompassing the community. It was added to the National Register of Historic Places on October 22, 1974 for its significance in architecture and industry. The district includes 7 contributing buildings. The Samuel Richards Mansion was built in 1826 with Greek Revival style.
