= Camden and Atlantic Railroad =

Railroad company in New Jersey

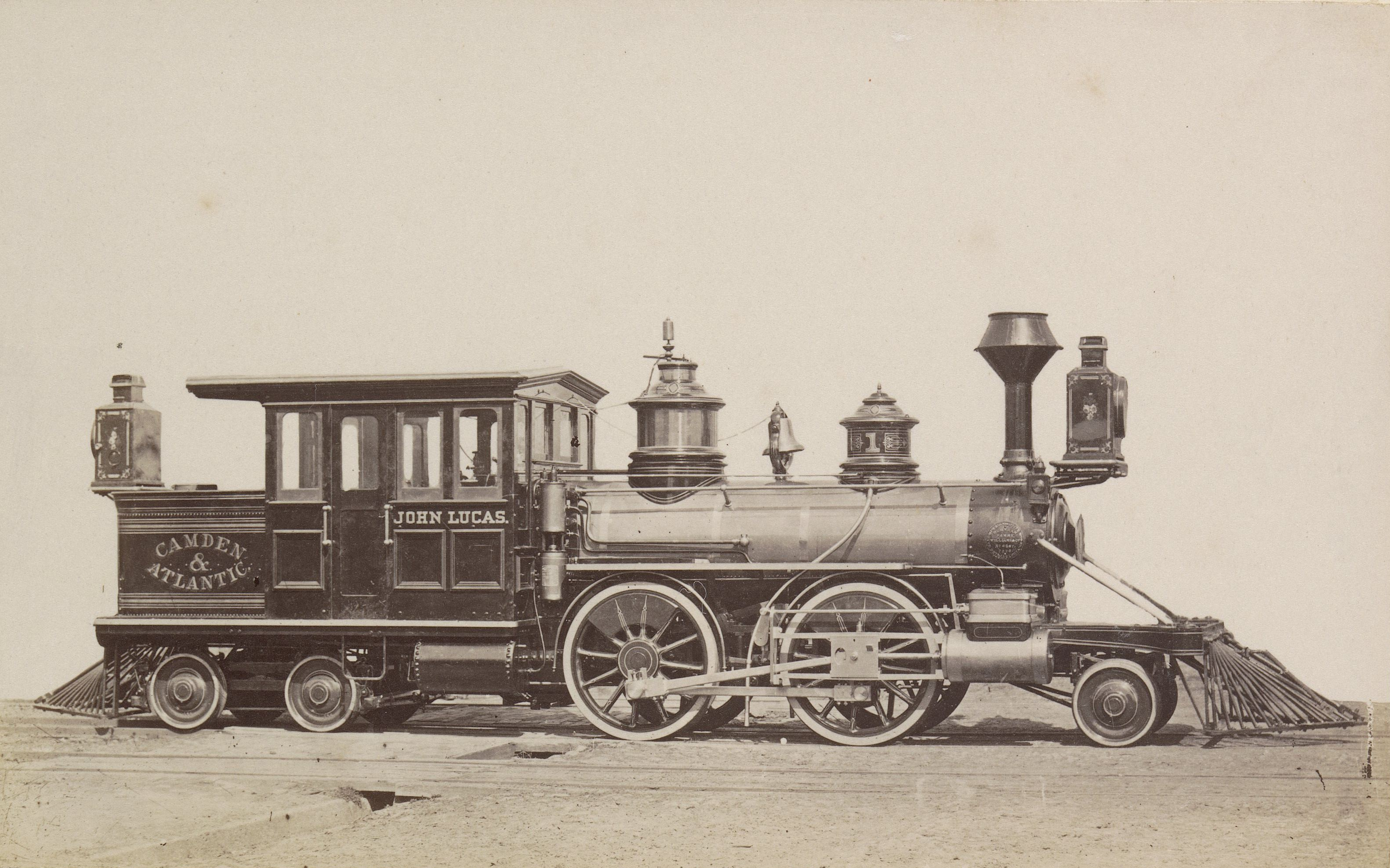
- Baldwin 2-4-4T locomotive circa 1878

Overview
- Dates of operation: 1852–1896
- Successor: West Jersey and Seashore Railroad

Technical
- Track gauge: 1,435 mm (4 ft 8 1/2 in)
- Length: 67.56 miles (108.73 km)

The Camden and Atlantic Railroad was a railway company in the United States. It opened the first railway line to Atlantic City, New Jersey, and played an important role in the development of that city. The company was incorporated in 1852 and completed its original line in 1854. It came under Pennsylvania Railroad control in 1883 and was consolidated with several companies to form the West Jersey and Seashore Railroad in 1896. NJ Transit's Atlantic City Line continues to use the company's former line for service between Philadelphia and Atlantic City.

== History ==
The impetus for the Camden and Atlantic Railroad came from Jonathan Pitney, a physician in Absecon, New Jersey, who believed that Absecon Island would be a desirable destination given good transportation. Pitney was able, with other South Jersey investors, to obtain a charter from the state in 1852. The new company was incorporated on March 19, 1852. Construction began in December 1852. The western end of the line was in Camden, New Jersey, at Cooper's Point on the Delaware River. Service to Atlantic City began on July 4, 1854, although at first passengers had to transfer to a ferry pending the completion of a drawbridge.

The new line was 59.79 miles (96.22 km) long. Its station in Camden was less than a mile north of the Camden and Amboy Railroad's, and it crossed the C&A main line within Camden. Although South Jersey was relatively unpopulated east of Berlin, New Jersey, the construction of the railroad encouraged growth, particularly in Atlantic City.

Although the Camden and Atlantic's charter authorized various branches, only one was built before 1881. This was the Atsion branch, built under contract by the Raritan and Delaware Bay Railroad. This line connected the Camden and Atlantic's main line (at Atco), with the Raritan and Delaware Bay Railroad's main line at Atsion. The line was never conveyed to the Camden and Atlantic because of a legal dispute with the Camden and Amboy.

The company gained its first direct competitor in 1876, with the founding of the Philadelphia and Atlantic City Railway. Among its directors were several former Camden and Atlantic directors. The new company completed a 3 ft 6 in (1,067 mm) narrow gauge line between Camden and Atlantic City in 1877. A third emerged in 1880 with the opening of the West Jersey and Atlantic Railroad's line via Newfield. In 1883, the Philadelphia and Reading Railroad took control of the Philadelphia and Atlantic City Railway, while the Pennsylvania Railroad took control of the Camden and Atlantic Railroad.

Between 1881 and 1891 the company constructed a branch totaling 8.37 miles (13.47 km). This line ran primarily on Atlantic Avenue in Atlantic City, from Longport to Absecon Inlet. It leased the Philadelphia, Marlton and Medford Railroad in 1885; the company owned a branch line between Haddonfield and Medford. It also operated the Chelsea Branch Railroad, whose small branch within Atlantic City provided another connection between the Camden and Atlantic main line and the branch on Atlantic Avenue. In 1890, passenger service in Camden was consolidated at the Pennsylvania Railroad's terminal on Federal Street. On February 8, 1896, the Camden and Atlantic was consolidated with the Chelsea Branch Railroad, Alloway and Quinton Railroad, West Jersey Railroad, West Jersey and Atlantic Railroad, and Philadelphia, Marlton and Medford Railroad to form the West Jersey and Seashore Railroad.
