= List of New York Central Railroad precursors =

The New York Central Railroad (NYCRR) was formed on December 22, 1914, as a consolidation of the companies listed below. It later merged with the Pennsylvania Railroad to form Penn Central.

The NYCRR owned stock in the New York, Chicago and St. Louis Railroad and the Lake Erie and Western Railroad, but sold it in July 1917 and April 1922, respectively.

== Adirondack and St. Lawrence Railroad ==
Also known as the Mohawk and Malone Railway, the Adirondack and St. Lawrence Railroad was built by Dr. William Seward Webb. The line crossed the northern Adirondacks at Tupper Lake Junction, just north of Tupper Lake. Webb began by purchasing the narrow gauge Herkimer, Newport and Poland Railroad, which ran 16 miles from Herkimer to Poland. He then had track built from Tupper Lake to Moira and thence to Montreal. This was variously called the Adirondack and St. Lawrence Railroad and the Mohawk and Malone Railway. It opened in 1892 from Malone Junction to Childwold Station with a branch from Lake Clear Junction to Saranac Lake. After 1893, it was controlled by the New York Central and Hudson River Railroad, and in 1913, it merged with the Central as the "Adirondack Division".

== Beech Creek Extension Railroad ==
- Canoe Creek Railroad
- Clearfield Southern Railroad

== Cleveland, Cincinnati, Chicago and St. Louis Railway ==
- Cairo, Vincennes and Chicago Railway
  - Cairo and Vincennes Railroad
- Central Railroad of Indianapolis
- Central Union Depot and Railway Company of Cincinnati
- Chicago, Indianapolis and St. Louis Short Line Railway
- Cincinnati and Michigan Railroad
- Cincinnati and Southern Ohio River Railway
- Cincinnati and Springfield Railway
- Cincinnati Northern Railroad
  - Cincinnati, Jackson and Mackinaw Railway
    - Cincinnati, Van Wert and Michigan Railroad
      - Celina, Van Wert and State Line
    - Columbus and Northwestern Railway
    - Michigan and Ohio Railroad
      - Allegan and Southeastern Railroad
- Cincinnati, Hamilton, Middletown and Toledo
- Cincinnati, Indianapolis, St. Louis and Chicago Railway
- Cincinnati, Sandusky and Cleveland Railroad
  - Cincinnati, Dayton and Eastern Railroad
- Cincinnati, Wabash and Michigan Railway
  - Cincinnati, Wabash and Michigan Railroad
- Cleveland, Columbus, Cincinnati and Indianapolis Railway
  - Bellefontaine Railway
    - Bellefontaine and Indiana Railroad
  - Cleveland, Columbus and Cincinnati Railroad
    - Cleveland, Columbus and Cincinnati Railway
- Cleveland, Indianapolis, St. Louis and Chicago Railway
- Columbus, Hope and Greensburg Railroad
- Columbus, Indianapolis and Western
- Columbus, Springfield and Cincinnati Railroad
- Mount Gilead Short Line Railway
  - Mount Gilead Short Line Railroad
- Peoria and Eastern Railway
  - Indianapolis Union Railway
    - Indianapolis Belt Railroad and Stock Yards
      - Indianapolis Belt Railroad
      - Union Railroad Transfer and Stock Yards
        - Indianapolis Belt Railway

== Detroit, Monroe and Toledo Railroad (original) ==
Chartered in 1855, the Detroit, Monroe and Toledo Railroad (DM&T) ran from Detroit, Michigan, south-southwest along the shore of Lake Erie to Monroe, Michigan. It crossed the state line into Ohio, where it ran into Toledo, Ohio. The line was completed on December 25, 1856. The DM&T leased itself in perpetuity to the Michigan Southern and Northern Indiana Railroad (MS&NI) on July 1, 1856. The MS&NI merged with the Lake Shore Railway in 1869 to form the Lake Shore and Michigan Southern Railway (LS&MS). The New York Central and Hudson River Railroad achieved a controlling interest in the LS&MS in 1877, and the two companies merged in 1914 to form the New York Central Railroad. The DM&T's assets were merged into the NYC on January 1, 1915.

== Dunkirk, Allegheny Valley and Pittsburgh Railroad (original) ==
- Conewango Valley Railroad
- Dunkirk, Warren and Pittsburgh Railway
  - Dunkirk, Warren and Pittsburgh Railroad

== Lake Shore and Michigan Southern Railway (original) ==
- Amboy, Lansing and Traverse Bay Railroad
- Buffalo and Erie Railroad
  - Buffalo and State Line Railroad
- Buffalo and Mississippi Railroad
- Battle Creek and Sturgis Railway
- Cleveland and Toledo Railroad
- Cleveland Short Line Railway
- Jamestown, Franklin and Clearfield Railroad
  - Central Trunk Railway
  - Jamestown and Franklin Railroad
    - Junction Railroad
      - Connection Railroad
- Lake Shore Railway
  - Cleveland, Painesville and Ashtabula Railroad
    - Cleveland and Erie Railroad

== Michigan Central Railroad ==
- Bay City and Battle Creek Railway
  - Bay City and Battle Creek Railroad
    - Battle Creek and Bay City Railway
- Buchanan and St. Joseph River Railroad
- Canada Junction
- Canada Southern Railway
- Central Railroad of Michigan
- Chicago, Kalamazoo and Saginaw Railway
- Detroit River Tunnel Company
  - Canada and Michigan Bridge and Tunnel Company
    - Canada and Michigan Tunnel Company
  - Michigan and Canada Bridge and Tunnel Company
- Jackson, Lansing and Saginaw Railroad
  - Amboy, Lansing and Traverse Bay Railroad
- Kalamazoo and South Haven Railroad

== New York Central and Hudson River Railroad (original) ==
=== Beech Creek Railroad ===
- Beech Creek, Clearfield and Southwestern Railroad
  - Susquehanna and Southwestern Railroad
- Cambria County Railroad

=== Boston and Albany Railroad ===
- Albany and West Stockbridge Railroad
  - Castleton and West Stockbridge Railroad
- Boston and Worcester Railroad
- Chester and Becket Railroad
- Grand Junction Railroad and Depot Company
  - Chelsea Branch Railroad
- Hudson and Boston Railroad
  - Hudson and Berkshire Railroad
- North Brookfield Railroad
- Pittsfield and North Adams Railroad
- Providence, Webster and Springfield Railroad
- Spencer Railroad
- Springfield and North-eastern Railroad
  - Springfield, Athol and North-eastern Railroad
    - Athol and Enfield Railroad
- Ware River Railroad
- Western Railroad

=== Buffalo and Lockport Railway ===
- Buffalo, Kenmore and Tonawanda Electric Railroad

=== Buffalo and Rochester Railroad ===
- Attica and Buffalo Railroad
- Tonawanda Railroad

=== Cape Vincent Railway ===
Construction was completed to Cape Vincent in April 1852. The railroad from limerick to Cape Vincent was abandoned 84 years later, and all rails were removed in the summer of 1967.

=== Carthage and Adirondack Railway ===
- Black River and St. Lawrence Railway

=== Hudson River Railroad ===
- Troy and Greenbush Railroad
- Troy Union Railroad

=== Mohawk and Malone Railway ===
- Adirondack and St. Lawrence Railway
- Herkimer, Newport and Poland Railway
  - Mohawk Valley and Northern Railway
    - Herkimer, Newport and Poland Railway
- Herkimer, Newport and Poland Extension Railway
  - Mohawk and Adirondack Railroad
- Herkimer, Newport and Poland Narrow Gauge Railway

=== New Jersey Junction Railroad (leased 7–1–1886) ===
- Jersey City and Bayonne Railroad (stock)
- New Jersey Shore Line Railroad (stock, absorbed 10–24–1914)
- New York and Fort Lee Railroad (leased, absorbed into NYC&HR 1886)
  - Hoboken and Hudson River Turnpike
  - New York and Bull's Ferry Railroad
- State Line and Stony Point Railroad (stock)

=== New York and Harlem Railroad (leased 4–1–1873) ===
- Fourth Avenue Street Railway (bought 1–31–1920)
- New York and Mahopac Railroad
- Port Morris Branch (c. 1842)

=== New York and Putnam Railroad ===
- New York and Northern Railway
  - New York City and Northern Railroad
    - West Side and Yonkers Railway
  - Yonkers Rapid Transit Railway

=== New York Central Railroad ===
- Albany and Schenectady Railroad
  - Mohawk and Hudson Railroad
- Cairo and Lake Huron
- Canandaigua and Niagara Falls Railroad
- Catskill Railroad
- Columbus Northwestern Railway
- Saratoga and Hudson River Railroad
- Ulster and Delaware Railroad
- Utica and Schenectady Railroad

=== Niagara Bridge and Canandaigua Railroad ===
- Canandaigua and Niagara Falls Railroad

=== Spuyten Duyvil and Port Morris Railroad ===
- Spuyten Duyvil and Port Morris Railroad

=== West Shore Railroad (leased 12-5-1885) ===
- Athens Branch
- Buffalo Lehigh
- New York, West Shore and Buffalo Railway (changed name 12–5–1885)
  - North River Railroad
    - Jersey City and Albany Railway
      - Jersey City and Albany Railroad
    - North River Railway
- Syracuse, Ontario and New York Railway (absorbed 6–30–1891)
- West Shore and Ontario Terminal Company (absorbed 7–9–1901)

== Toledo and Ohio Central Railway ==
- Atlantic and Lake Erie Railroad
- Atlantic and Northwestern Railroad
- Ohio Central Railroad
  - Columbus and Sunday Creek Valley Railroad
    - Ohio Central Railway
- Zanesville and Western Railroad

== Ulster and Delaware Railroad (merged 1932) ==
- Rondout and Oswego Railroad
- New York, Kingston and Syracuse Railroad
  - Hobart Branch Railroad (absorbed 1884)
  - Delaware and Otsego Railroad (absorbed 1887)
  - Stony Clove and Catskill Mountain Railroad (absorbed 1892)
  - Kaaterskill Railroad (absorbed 1892)
