= Highland Falls station =

Highland Falls
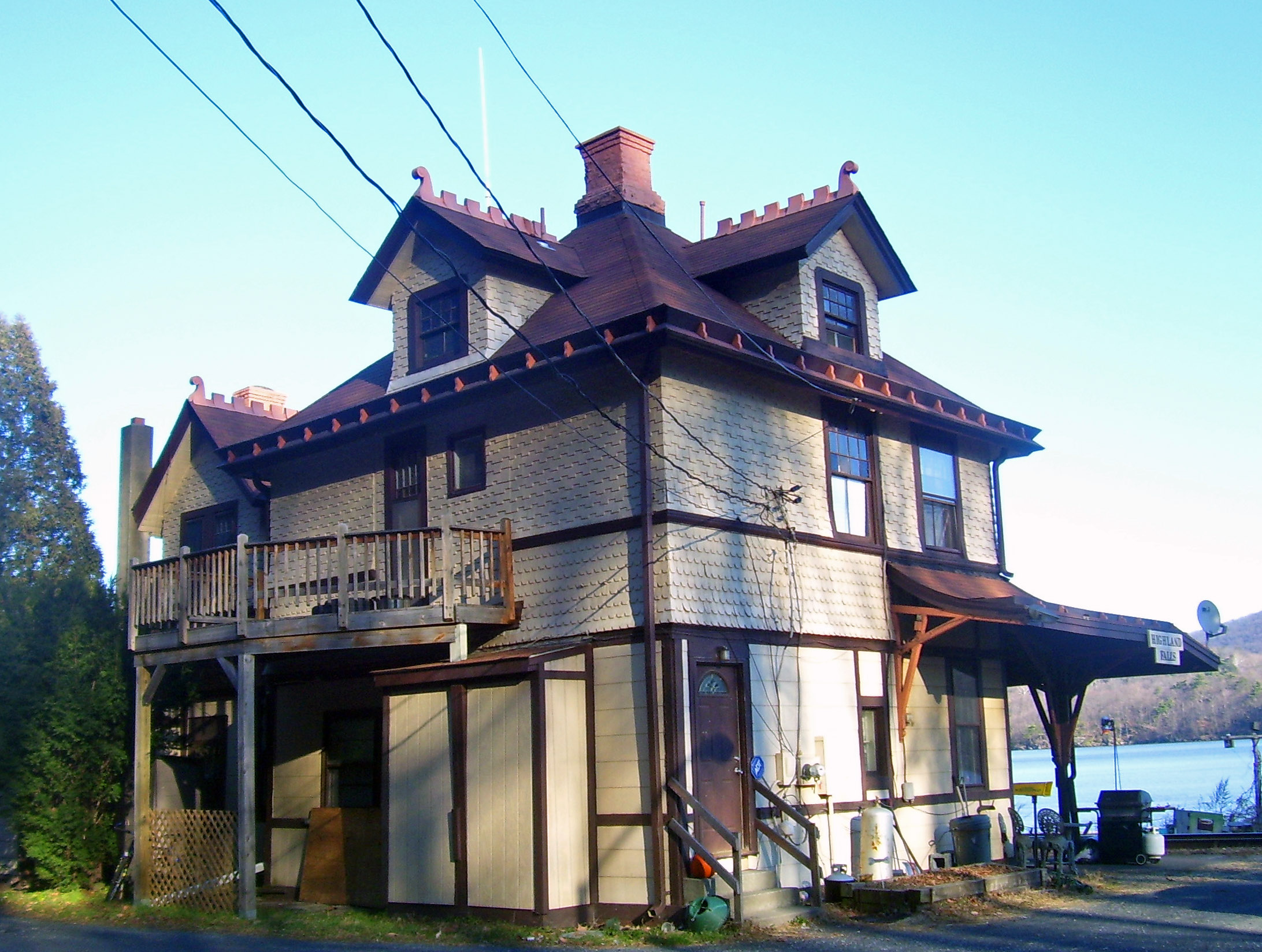
- West profile and south elevation, 2008

General information
- Location: End of Station Hill Road, Highland Falls, Orange County, New York
- Tracks: 1

Services
| Preceding station | New York Central Railroad | Following station |
|---|---|---|
| Milton toward Buffalo–Exchange Street | River Division | Ridgefield Park toward Weehawken |
| West Point toward Buffalo–Exchange Street | River Division | Fort Montgomery toward Weehawken |
- Highland Falls Railroad Depot
- U.S. National Register of Historic Places
- Location within New York Location within the United States
- Location: Highland Falls, NY
- Coordinates: 41°22′27″N 73°57′39″W
- Area: 1.2 acres (4,900 m^{2})
- Built: 1882
- Architect: West Shore Railroad
- Architectural style: Shingle Style
- MPS: Hudson Highlands MRA (see Hudson Highlands MRA)
- NRHP reference No.: 82001218
- Added to NRHP: November 23, 1982
Location

Highland Falls Station in Highland Falls, New York, is a former West Shore Railroad train station built in the 1880s. It was later used by the New York Central Railroad. Since the mid-20th century it has been used as a residence; the tracks are still used as a CSX freight line.

It is, along with the Milton Railroad Station to the north in Ulster County, one of the few remaining original West Shore Railroad passenger stations. Its Shingle Style architecture is the most sophisticated example of that mode in the village. In 1982 it was listed on the National Register of Historic Places as Highland Falls Railroad Depot.

It was a station for local passenger trains between Weehawken and Newburgh, and for limited trains between Weehawken and Albany. Sequentially, the station south of Highland Falls on the West Shore Railroad was Fort Montgomery. The next station, north-bound, was West Point station for the West Point Military Academy. These trains were discontinued in 1958.

== Building ==
The station building is located west of the tracks, currently used by CSX's Hudson River Subdivision, at the foot of Station Hill Road where it descends from downtown Highland Falls to the river. It is on a 1.2-acre (4,900 m^{2}) sliver-shaped lot with no other development nearby and high stony bluffs to the west. To the east are the docks of a marina run from the property.

The building itself is a two-story frame building sided in two types of shingles on the second story and clapboard below, with wooden courses dividing the different sidings and then running at water table level on the first story. The pyramidal roof is pierced by a central brick chimney and three gabled dormer windows. Their ridges, as well as the roof, have decorative crockets.

A central pavilion projects from the north. On the east a shed roof shelters the former platform both north and south of the building. Two small lean-tos are on the north and west.

== History ==
The railroad was built through the area in 1882, and the station first appears in maps not long afterwards, in 1891. Many of the workers who had built the railroad and the station settled in nearby neighborhoods, swelling the population of what had primarily been a summer resort community and the nearest town to the West Point Military Academy. The station's highly decorative use of the Shingle Style is the best example of it in the village.

Passenger service ended in 1958. The station was then converted into a residence, retaining most of the original features.

The village attempted to negotiate with the current owners to purchase property and preserve the only public access to the river within its limits. After those broke down in early 2006, the village received a $350,000 state grant. The owners say they will not sell to the village, who they argued had bungled the deal.

== See also ==
- National Register of Historic Places listings in Orange County, New York
