= Milton station (New York) =

Milton
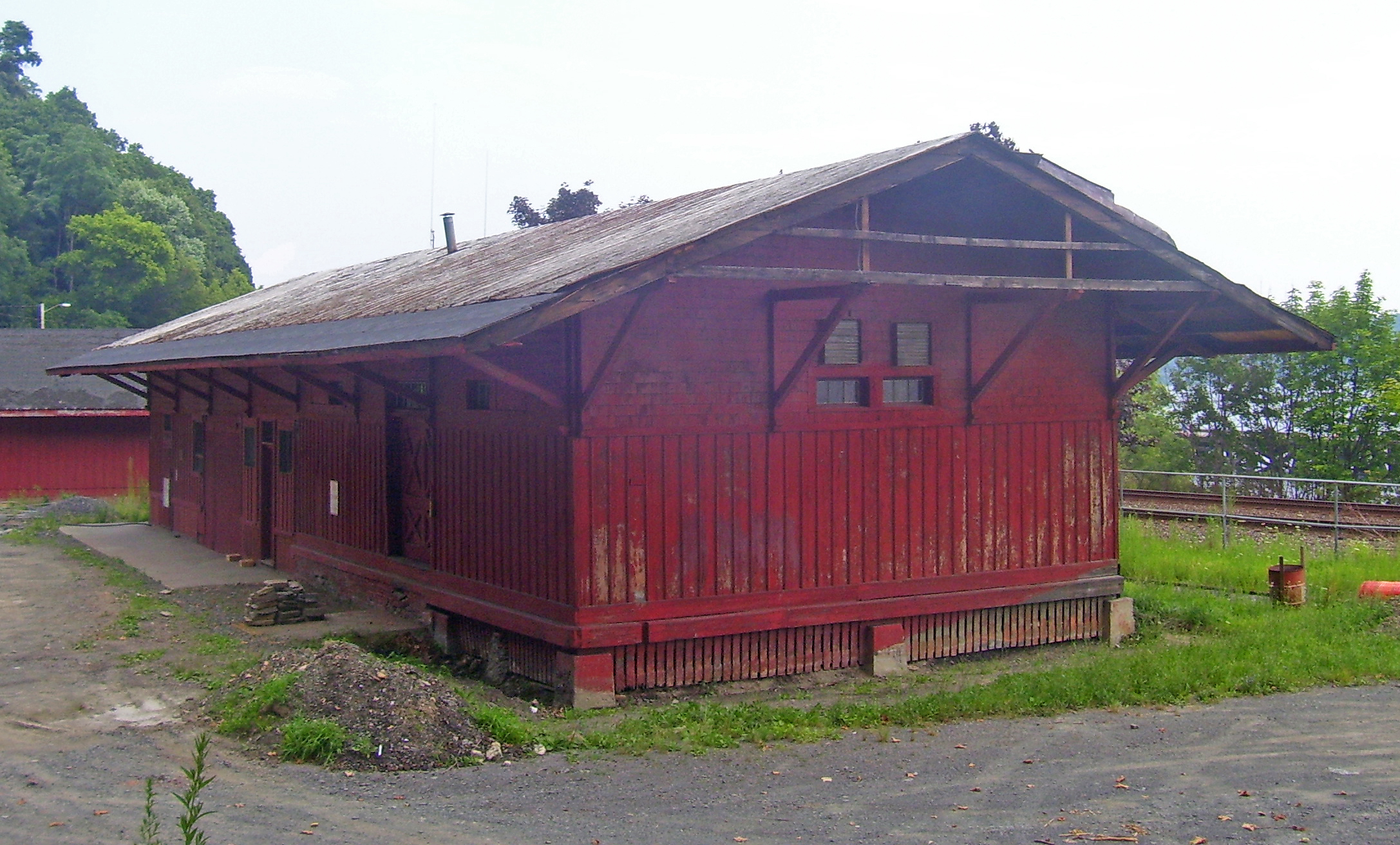
- West elevation and south profile, 2008

General information
- Location: Old Indian Trail, Milton, Ulster County, New York
- Tracks: 1

Services
Preceding station	New York Central Railroad	Following station
Highland toward Buffalo–Exchange Street	River Division	Marlborough toward Weehawken
- Milton Railroad Station
- U.S. National Register of Historic Places
- Location: Milton, NY
- Nearest city: Poughkeepsie
- Coordinates: 41°39′09″N 73°57′15″W
- Area: 0.61 acres (2,500 m^{2})
- Built: 1883
- Architect: Wilson Brothers & Company
- Architectural style: Stick and other Late Victorian styles
- NRHP reference No.: 07000873
- Added to NRHP: August 28, 2007
Location

Milton station is a disused train station located on Dock Road at the Hudson River in Milton, New York, United States. It is a frame rectangular structure built for the West Shore Railroad in the late 19th century.

Passenger service ended in 1959. The station survives with the Highland Falls station as one of the few extant West Shore Railroad passenger stations. It was added to the National Register of Historic Places (NRHP) in 2007 as the Milton Railroad Station. It has been used for tastings by a local winery, and a community group is renovating it to serve the Town of Marlborough as a community center.

== Description ==
The station is located where Dock Road comes down from downtown Milton to the river's edge, in the midst of a small former industrial area. The Old Indian Trail Road leads to it from the south. A short, overgrown siding that once served the station and is considered a contributing resource to its NRHP listing is to the east. It is no longer connected to the still-active tracks between the station and the river.

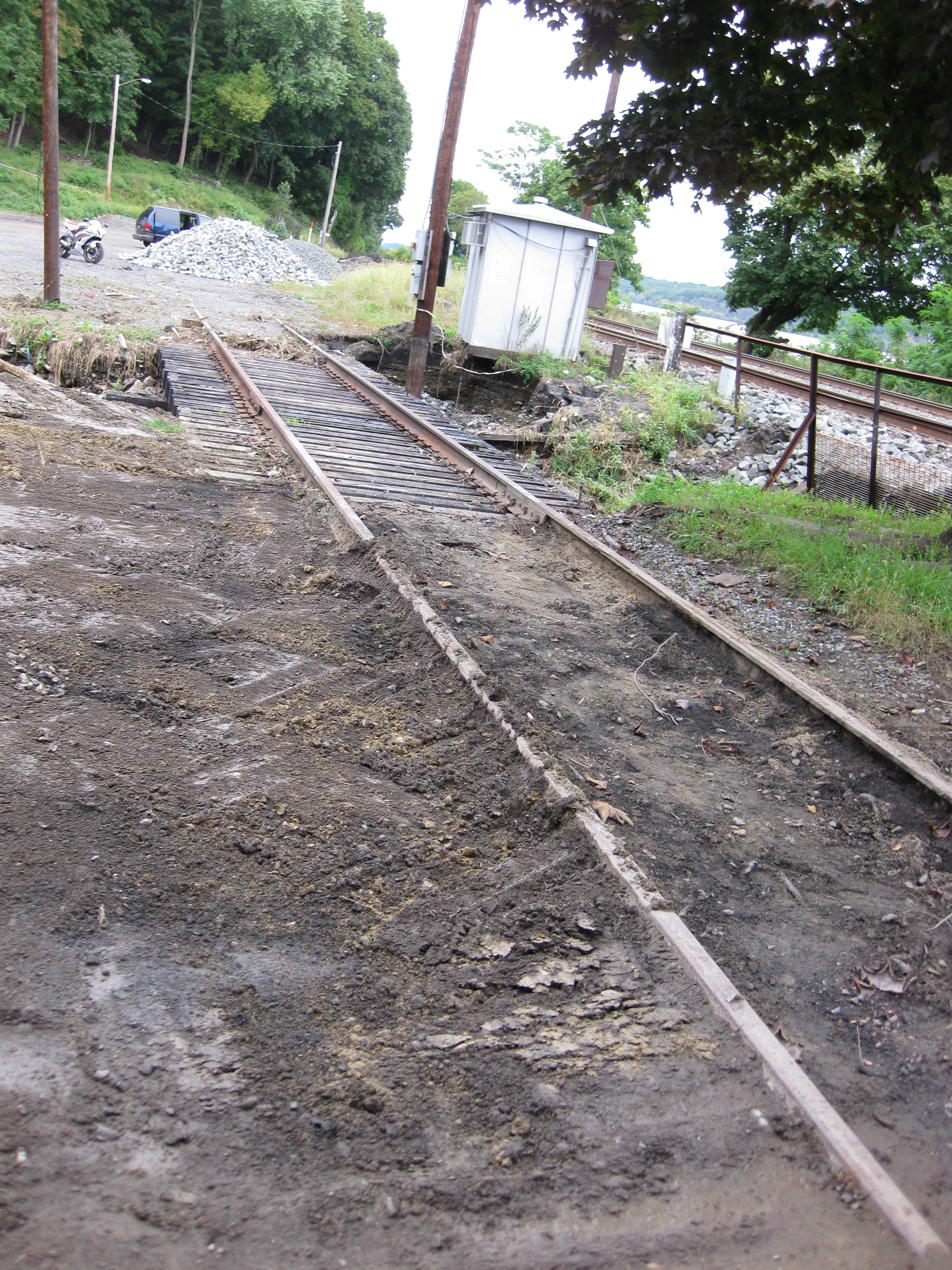
Disconnected freight siding

The building is a one-story frame 30-by-83-foot (9.1 by 25.3 m) rectangular building with a broad gable tin roof and overhanging eaves. Its board-and-batten siding is painted red. The northern two-thirds of the building, the oldest part, sits on a sandstone foundation, while the southern portion rests on masonry piers.

Inside most of the area was built for passenger operations. It has a waiting room with a fireplace and chimney, ticket office, two bathrooms and a cross hallway. The walls of the passenger area are decorated in beaded panelling and horizontal trim. Some of the railway's communications equipment remains in the attic, and freight scales remain in that area.

=== Aesthetics ===
In one of the gables was a hallmark of the station's architects, a bargeboard with the scroll-sawn word FREIGHT. Aesthetically, it reflects the Stick style common in the period of its construction, with its well-integrated forms and flamboyant detailing leaving the building's singular function apparent. The battens provide vertical scale and the window trim the horizontal.

== History ==
The station site had been actively used for transportation purposes by local Native Americans long before the first colonists arrived in the 17th century. Dock Road follows a ravine and stream down to the river, making it one of the few places where access to it from inland settlements was easy. When the future Town of Marlborough was settled around 1710, the station site was the boundary between its first two land grants, and some of the first houses were built nearby. A dock and related structures had been built by the end of the century.

It continued to grow in the early half of the 19th century, becoming a regular steamboat port and the eastern end of the Farmer's Turnpike, which extended out to the foot of the Shawangunk Ridge in Gardiner, New York. A wheelbarrow factory at the site did a steady business. These interests resisted at first when the West Shore Railroad began acquiring property for their attempt to compete with the New York Central Railroad's (NYC) Water Level Route across the river. Their litigation was dismissed in 1882, and the station opened the next year.

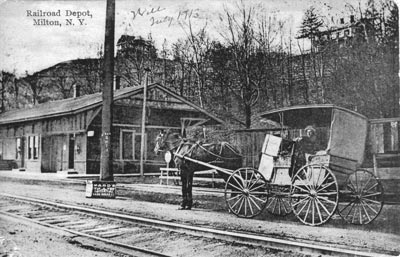
Postcard of station, circa 1913

The West Shore failed in its attempt to compete with NYC, and was absorbed into it after bankruptcy proceedings in 1885. The new owner expanded the station to its current size in order to handle freight shipments more efficiently. NYC eventually added a steam-boiler heating system.

In the 1950s, airplane jet travel and the Interstate Highway System began offering alternatives to railroads, and the last passenger train stopped at Milton in 1958. A local winery bought the station and used it for tastings, putting in a steel stairway to the basement and removing the partitions that separated the station master and ticket agent's offices from the waiting room.

In 1998, the winery sold the property to the town. The Friends of Milton Station began raising $100,000 to restore the station to its original appearance for use as a community center. The town has been seeking grant money from the state and other sources to cover the rest.

== See also ==
- National Register of Historic Places listings in Ulster County, New York
