= Ridgefield Park station =

Railroad station in New Jersey, U.S.

Coordinates: 40°51′24″N 74°1′40″W

Ridgefield Park
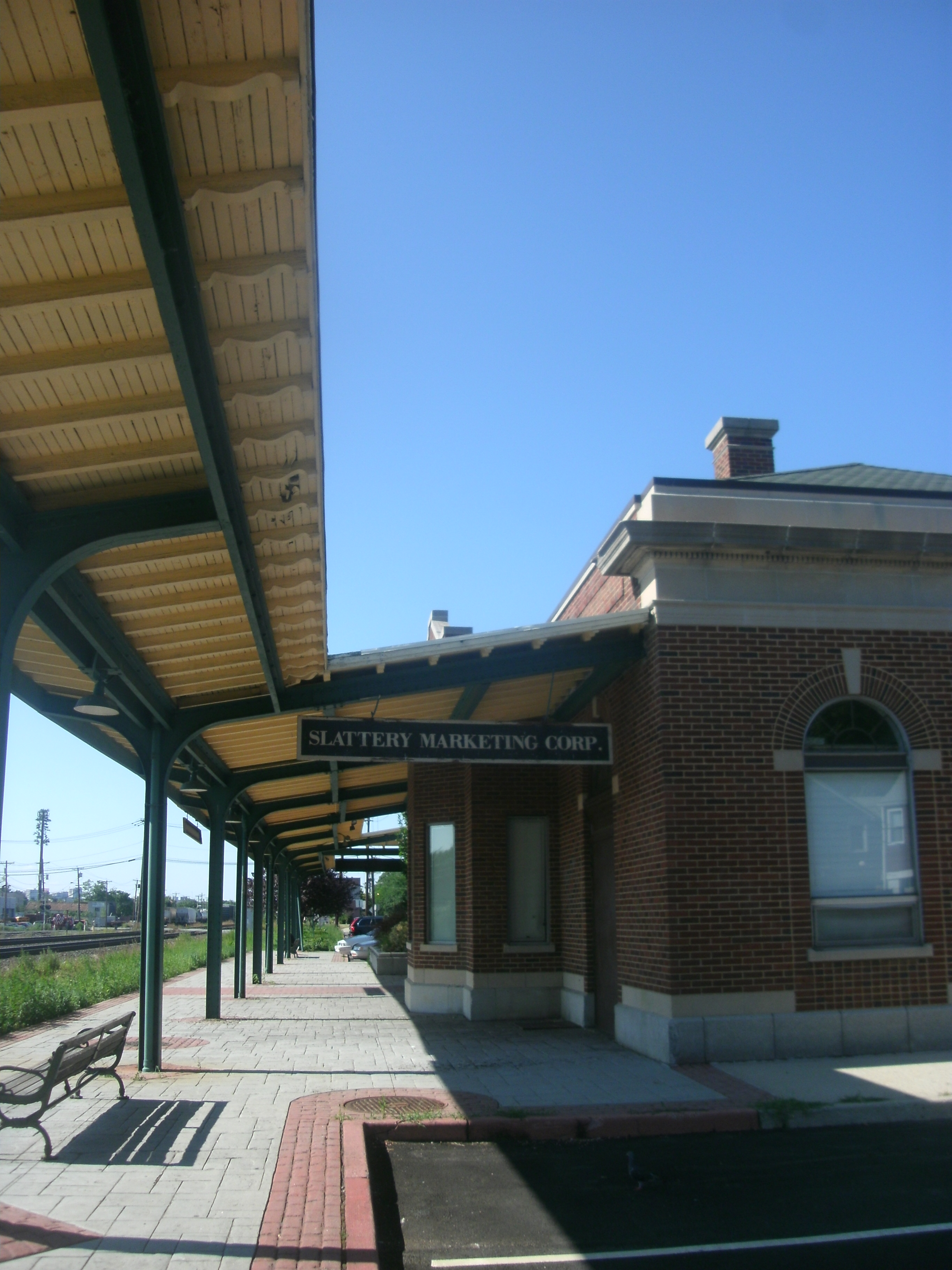

General information
- Location: 1 Station Plaza; Ridgefield Park, New Jersey 07660
- Owner: New York Central
- Lines: West Shore Railroad; New York, Susquehanna and Western Railroad; New York, Ontario and Western Railway
- Platforms: 1 side platform
- Tracks: 3

Other information
- Station code: 1077 (Erie Railroad); RP (NYS&W)

History
- Opened: 1872; 154 years ago
- Closed: December 10, 1959; 66 years ago June 30, 1966; 60 years ago (NYS&W)
- Rebuilt: August 20, 1927; 99 years ago
- Electrified: Not electrified

Former services
Preceding station	New York Central Railroad	Following station
Highland Falls toward Buffalo–Exchange Street	River Division	Weehawken Terminus
West View toward Buffalo–Exchange Street	River Division	Little Ferry toward Weehawken
Preceding station	New York, Susquehanna and Western Railroad	Following station
Bogota toward Stroudsburg	Main Line	Little Ferry toward Susquehanna Transfer or Jersey City

Proposed services (at Mount Vernon Street)
Preceding station	NJ Transit	Following station
Vince Lombardi Park & Ride toward Tonnelle Avenue	Passaic–Bergen–Hudson Transit (TBD)	Central Avenue–Bogota toward Hawthorne
Location

Ridgefield Park station, also known as West Shore Station, was a railroad station in Ridgefield Park, New Jersey, at the foot of Mount Vernon Street served by the New York, Susquehanna and Western Railroad (NYSW) and the West Shore Railroad, a division of New York Central (NYCRR). The New York, Ontario and Western Railway (NYO&W) had running rights along the West Shore and sometimes stopped at Ridgefield Park. First opened in 1872 it was one of three passenger stations in the village, the others being the Little Ferry station to the south and Westview station to the north. (Secondary sources note a later opening date.) Service on the West Shore Railroad began in 1883. The station house, built at a cost of $100,000 opened in 1927. Southbound service crossed Overpeck Creek and continued to terminals on the Hudson River waterfront where there was a connecting ferry service across the Hudson River to Manhattan. Northbound near Bogota the parallel NYSW and West Shore lines diverge and continue into northern New Jersey, Pennsylvania, and upstate New York. Passenger service ended in 1966.

== History ==
In 1866, the Ridgefield Park Railroad (a predecessor to West Shore), was established to create a right of way (ROW) along foot the western slope of the Hudson Palisades parallel to the Hackensack River from Ridgefield Park to Marion Junction, where it could use the Bergen Hill Cut to the Pennsylvania Railroad Depot on the Hudson Waterfront in Jersey City. In 1873 the Jersey City & Albany Railroad (another predecessor to the West Shore) incorporated the original Ridgefield Park Railroad ROW into its projected line. The West Shore instead built the Weehawken Tunnel (at the southern end of what became North Bergen Yard) in conjunction with the opening of the Weehawken Terminal. It opened its station in Ridgefield Park in 1883. NYC's service was discontinued in 1959.

The New Jersey Midland Railway (a predecessor to the NYSW) built a line through the Ridgefields in 1872. It joined the Erie Railroad Northern Branch at Granton Junction near Babbitt, and reached the community of New Durham. With a similar intention to reach a terminal on the Hudson River, in 1873 it built the Hudson Connecting Railway which ran south to West End Junction, just north of Marion Junction, with access to Erie's Long Dock Tunnel and Pavonia Terminal. Passenger service on the NYC's West Shore Railroad ended in 1959, having been truncated to West Haverstraw in 1958. Passenger service on the NYSW made use of the West Shore's Ridgefield Park station to Pavonia Terminal until it was retracted to Susquehanna Transfer (near the point now under New Jersey Route 495) and eventually terminated in 1966.

== Status and future use ==
CSX Transportation's River Line and the NYS&W both operate freights along the rail lines that pass the station. NYS&W maintains a small yard in the village.

The station house has become a commercial building. It has been recommended for historic designation by the county's historical agency. and is a very popular location for train watchers.

The CSX bridge over Overpeck Creek was replaced by a two-track swing bridge in 2005. In 2015, the NYS&W Bridge 10.73 was slated for replacement due to its poor condition, but as of 2017 work had not begun. Before it could, the bridge collapsed in 2018, causing a minor derailment. Work commenced in 2019.

Numerous studies to restore passenger service have been conducted, but not materialized. The location is a potential station of New Jersey Transit Rail Operations's proposed Passaic–Bergen–Hudson Transit Project which would be called Mount Vernon Street.

== See also ==
- Little Ferry Yard
- Northern Branch Corridor Project
- River Line (Conrail)

== Bibliography ==
- Carlough, Curtis V.; Fredericks, Harold; Stuy, Timothy; Van Dyk, Fred (1999). The Next Station Will Be... Volume 1 (Revised). New Jersey Midland Railroad Historical Society, Inc. ISBN 9780941652155.
