= New York, West Shore and Buffalo Railway =

Railway company in New York and New Jersey

- System map of the New York, West Shore and Buffalo Railway. Not shown: the branch line between Cornwall and Middleton.

Overview
- Dates of operation: 1880–1885
- Predecessors: New York, West Shore and Chicago Railroad; North River Railroad
- Successor: West Shore Railroad

Technical
- Track gauge: 1,435 mm (4 ft 8 1/2 in)
- Length: 461.2 miles (742.2 km)

The New York, West Shore and Buffalo Railway was a railway company in the United States. It was established in 1880 to continue the development of a new trunk line between New York City and Buffalo, New York, via Albany, New York. This line, 423 miles (681 km) long, was completed in 1883. Although intended as a direct competitor to the New York Central and Hudson River Railroad, the latter company wound up taking control in 1885. That same year, the company was reorganized as the West Shore Railroad. Its main line became the West Shore Railroad main line.

== History ==
=== Predecessors ===
On the west side of New York, the oldest corporate predecessor of the New York, West Shore and Buffalo Railway was the Hudson River West Shore Railroad. This company was incorporated on September 16, 1867. It built no track before being merged into the West Shore Hudson River Railroad on March 31, 1868. That company had been incorporated on October 28, 1867. It likewise built no track before being merged into the New York, West Shore and Chicago Railroad on July 21, 1877. New York, West Shore and Chicago Railroad was incorporated on July 13, 1870. Unlike its predecessors, it did undertake some construction work before being sold at foreclosure on February 7, 1879.

On the east side of New York, the Jersey City and Albany Railroad and its successor the Jersey City and Albany Railway had completed a 26-mile (42 km) line between Ridgefield Park, New Jersey, where it connected with the New Jersey Midland Railway; and Haverstraw, New York. The North River Railway, incorporated on April 3, 1880, began building north from the end of the Jersey City and Albany Railway's line. The two companies were consolidated on May 5, 1881, to create the North River Railroad. That company was leased by the New York, Ontario and Western Railway.

=== Construction ===
The New York, West Shore and Buffalo Railway was incorporated on February 18, 1880. It acquired the New York, West Shore and Chicago Railroad on August 27. The New York, West Shore and Buffalo Railway was consolidated with the North River Railroad on June 14, 1881; the new company kept the name New York, West Shore and Buffalo Railway. Its planned route ran parallel to the main line of the New York Central and Hudson River Railroad across Upstate New York. In Buffalo, it would connected with the Nickel Plate Road. The new company was able to attract powerful investors who were unaffiliated with the New York Central, including Edward Francis Winslow and George M. Pullman.

Construction proceeded and in total the company built 435 route miles (700 km) between 1881 and 1883. Starting from Haverstraw, the company built 391.6 miles (630.2 km) to Buffalo, New York. West of Schenectady, the line generally followed the south bank of the Mohawk River and then the Erie Canal. In New Jersey, the company built a 5.8-mile (9.3 km) line south to Weehawken, on the Hudson River. This line included the Weehawken Tunnel, bored through Bergen Hill.

Between Coxsackie, New York, and Fullers, New York, the company's line followed the former line of the Saratoga and Hudson River Railroad, then the Athens Branch of the New York Central and Hudson River Railroad. The New York, West Shore and Buffalo Railway leased this line on December 2, 1881.

In addition to its main line the company had two branch lines. One, the Kenwood Branch, extended 12 miles (19 km) from Ravena, New York, to Kenwood, on the south side of Albany, where it connected with the Delaware and Hudson Railway. The other was a 26-mile (42 km) line from Cornwall, New York, to Middletown, New York, built under contract by the New York, Ontario and Western Railway.

=== New York Central control ===
The New York Central and Hudson River Railroad took steps to defend itself against this new competitor. In 1882, it had its Lake Shore and Michigan Southern Railway subsidiary acquire control of the Nickel Plate, depriving the New York, West Shore and Buffalo Railway of its connection west of Buffalo. Believing that its rival the Pennsylvania Railroad was involved with the West Shore, the New York Central also backed the creation of the Beech Creek Railroad and South Pennsylvania Railroad, direct competitors to the Pennsylvania Railroad. Concerned by the fractious competition, the financier J. P. Morgan brokered an agreement between the Pennsylvania and New York Central. The Pennsylvania acquired the Beech Creek and South Pennsylvania, while the New York Central took stock control of the reorganized West Shore Railroad. The branch line between Cornwall and Middleton was conveyed to the New York, Ontario and Western Railway.
