= Saratoga and Hudson River Railroad =

Overview
- Founders: Daniel Drew
- Dates of operation: 1864–1867
- Successor: New York Central Railroad

Technical
- Track gauge: 1,435 mm (4 ft 8 1/2 in)
- Length: 37 miles (60 km)

The Saratoga and Hudson River Railroad was a railway company in the United States. It was established in 1864 by Daniel Drew, in order to further his steamboat interests on the Hudson River. The railroad became caught up in competition between Drew and Cornelius Vanderbilt, who controlled the rival Hudson River Railroad and New York and Harlem Railroad. The railroad completed a 37-mile (60 km) line between Schenectady, New York, and Athens, New York, in 1866. The company was merged into the New York Central Railroad in 1867. Some of its line was eventually incorporated into the West Shore Railroad main line.

== History ==
In the mid-19th century steamboat traffic on the Hudson River between New York City and Albany, New York, was a lucrative trade. The first railroad to directly challenge steamboat traffic was the Hudson River Railroad, which began running between New York and Greenbush, New York (now Rensselaer), across the Hudson from Albany, in 1851. Although less comfortable than steamboats, trains possessed two advantages: they made the trip in four hours instead of seven and a half, and they could operate in the winter, when ice closed the Hudson.

Daniel Drew, a major New York financier, controlled the People's Line, a major Hudson steamship company, and also invested in various railroads. The planned Saratoga and Hudson River Railroad would connect with the New York Central Railroad at Schenectady, New York, and run south to Athens, New York, a village on the west bank of the Hudson. Athens, being south of Albany, would remain ice-free for a longer amount of time. In addition, the new railroad would connect directly with the Saratoga and Schenectady Railroad, offering better service to the Saratoga Springs resort.

The Saratoga and Hudson River Railroad was incorporated on April 16, 1864. The line was completed between Schenectady and Athens in March 1866, after which the New York Central Railroad leased the company. The planned steamboat service to Athens did not commence. The reasons are unclear, though rooted in the business rivalry between Drew and Cornelius Vanderbilt, who controlled the rival Hudson River Railroad and New York and Harlem Railroad, both of which ran on the east side of the Hudson. Steamboat service to Athens finally began on May 13, 1867. The New York Central acquired the company on September 9, 1867. Vanderbilt took control of the New York Central in December 1867, and eliminated through traffic on the line.

The New York Central was consolidated with the Hudson River Railroad in 1869 to form the New York Central and Hudson River Railroad. The Saratoga and Hudson River Railroad's line was abandoned south of Coxsackie, New York, in 1876. The section between Coxsackie and Fullers, New York, was leased to the New York, West Shore and Buffalo Railway on December 2, 1881, and became part of the West Shore Railroad main line. Also abandoned was the northern end between Fullers and Schenectady.
