= West Shore Railroad =

Former railroad in New Jersey and New York

Overview
- Locale: New Jersey and New York
- Dates of operation: 1885–1952
- Predecessor: New York, West Shore and Buffalo Railway
- Successor: New York Central Railroad

Technical
- Track gauge: 1,435 mm (4 ft 8 1/2 in)

The West Shore Railroad was a U.S. railway company active in the states of New York and New Jersey between 1885 and 1952. It was incorporated in 1885 to reorganize the New York, West Shore and Buffalo Railway, which had originally been intended as a competitor to the New York Central and Hudson River Railroad.

The oldest original component of the line traced to 1866, with other lines and trackage rights acquired into the 1880s. Its main line ran from Weehawken, New Jersey, on the west bank of the Hudson River opposite New York City, north to Albany, New York, and then west to Buffalo.

An effort by the powerful Pennsylvania Railroad to acquire the New York West Shore and Buffalo Railway and challenge the New York Central on its home state resulted in a turf war, settled by financier J. P. Morgan, with the NYC taking the line over in return for dropping its South Pennsylvania Railroad incursion into the heart of the Pennsylvania's territory. Within a week of being acquired in late November of 1885, the line it was reincorporated as the West Shore Railroad; it was formally merged into the New York Central Railroad in 1952.

== History ==
=== Jersey City and Albany ===
The earliest corporate predecessor of the West Shore Railroad was the Ridgefield Park Railroad, which was incorporated on April 4, 1867, to construct a line between Ridgefield Park, New Jersey, and Tappan, New York, branching off the New Jersey Midland Railway. This line was completed by the Jersey City and Albany Railroad in 1873. The New Jersey Midland Railway operated the line. Following a period of receivership, the Jersey City and Albany Railroad was reorganized as the Jersey City and Albany Railway, and extended its line north to Haverstraw, New York, in 1880.

=== New York, West Shore and Buffalo Railway ===
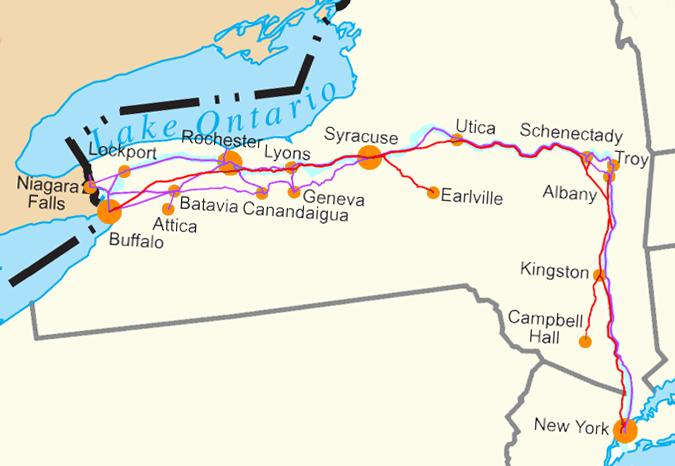
Map of the Water Level Routes of the New York Central Railroad (purple), West Shore Railroad (red) and Erie Canal (blue)

The New York, West Shore and Buffalo Railway was incorporated on February 18, 1880. It bought several unbuilt lines in western New York, and on June 14, 1881 was consolidated with the North River Railroad, thereby acquiring the line between Ridgefield Park and Haverstraw. With significant financial backing, including Edward Francis Winslow and George M. Pullman, the company was ready to challenge the New York Central and Hudson River Railroad. Between 1881 and 1883 the company built 435 route miles (700 km), including a new trunk line from Haverstraw to Buffalo, New York, and a southern extension to Weehawken, New Jersey, on the Hudson River.

The creation of this new trunk line led to fractious competition between the New York Central and the Pennsylvania Railroad. In 1885, financier J. P. Morgan brokered a deal between the two companies, in which the New York Central would take control of the West Shore route in exchange for the Pennsylvania buying the Beech Creek Railroad and South Pennsylvania Railroad. The New York, West Shore and Buffalo Railway was reorganized as the West Shore Railroad on December 5, 1885, under New York Central control.

=== New York Central control ===
Various connections (red) made the West Shore (orange) into a bypass of Albany and Schenectady

In many sections, the WS ran on a straighter path than the NYC, and was thus used for through freight. For instance, between Oneida and Utica, the WS followed the general line of the never-built Syracuse and Utica Direct Railroad, which had been merged into the NYC.

The West Shore Railroad was one of seven subsidiaries merged into the New York Central Railroad on June 20, 1952, along with the Lake Erie, Alliance and Wheeling Railroad, New Jersey Junction Railroad, New York and Fort Lee Railroad, Toledo and Ohio Central Railway, Wallkill Valley Railroad, and Federal Valley Railroad.

=== Named trains and route stations ===
Several named trains traveled north from Weehawken to Albany including the Storm King Limited and the West Pointer. Main stops between Albany Union Station and Weehawken Terminal included Ravena, Coxsackie, Catskill, Saugerties, Kingston, Highland, Marlboro, Newburgh, Cornwall, West Point, Haverstraw, Congers, West Nyack, Orangeburg and Tappan, all in New York, and Dumont, Teaneck, Bogota and Ridgefield Park in New Jersey.

== Current use ==
Passenger service on the line ended to Albany in 1958 and to West Haverstraw in 1959, ending direct New York Central passenger train service on the west side of the Hudson River. The line became part of Penn Central in 1968, and passed to Conrail in 1976 after Penn Central's 1970 bankruptcy. When Conrail was divided between CSX Transportation and Norfolk Southern, in 1999, the West Shore Railroad, along with most of the old New York Central lines, became part of CSX.

It became CSX's River Subdivision, which begins west of the Hudson Palisades at North Bergen Yard in Hudson County, New Jersey. Proceeding north it passes through Bergen County and Rockland County, New York, and up the west side of the Hudson River to Selkirk Yard, from which there are connections to points west and east. South of North Bergen Yard it connects to the Northern Running Track, part of Conrail. The tunnel under the Palisades is part of the Hudson Bergen Light Rail which emerges at the Hudson Waterfront at Weehawken Port Imperial.

== West Shore Regional Proposal ==
Throughout the late 1980s and early 1990s, New Jersey Transit, the main provider of contemporary rail and bus service in the locale, expressed interest in potentially restoring passenger service to the line due to ever-increasing ridership on the local bus lines.

In 1997, a $3.97 million grant was given to New Jersey Transit by the Federal Transit Administration. At the time, many towns along the line supported the idea, and went as far as conducting zoning procedures to allow room for the new additions the railroad would bring. Considering the current line is not under proprietorship of New Jersey Transit, a new right-of-way would be installed parallel to the existing freight line.

However, funding remained an issue, as did disagreement with CSX. Ultimately, focus on the project was dropped in favor of progress on the Northern Branch Corridor Project and Meadowlands Rail Line (completed in 2009). In 2026 New York State Senator James Skoufis included funding for a service restoration feasibility study in the proposed state budget. Revival of a line serving Grand Central would provide a one seat ride to Manhattan for residents of Orange, Rockland and Ulster counties in New York.

== See also ==
- Highland Falls station
- Kingston, New York railroad stations
- Milton station (New York)
- Weehawken Terminal
