= Syracuse, Chenango and New York Railroad =

Overview
- Locale: Syracuse, New York to Earlville
- Dates of operation: 1868–1883
- Successor: Syracuse, Ontario and New York Railway later part of New York Central Railroad (NYCRR)

Technical
- Track gauge: 4 ft 8 1/2 in (1,435 mm) standard gauge

The Syracuse and Chenango Valley Railroad was incorporated April 16, 1868, and had routes through the Chenango Valley from the city of Syracuse in Onondaga County to the village of Earlville in Madison County, a distance of 45.49 miles (73.21 km). It was renamed to Syracuse and Chenango Railroad in 1873 and into Syracuse, Chenango and New York Railroad in 1877.

During 1883, the road merged into Syracuse, Ontario and New York Railway and by 1891 became part of New York Central Railroad (NYCRR).
