= Milton, Ulster County, New York =

Milton
- CDP and hamlet
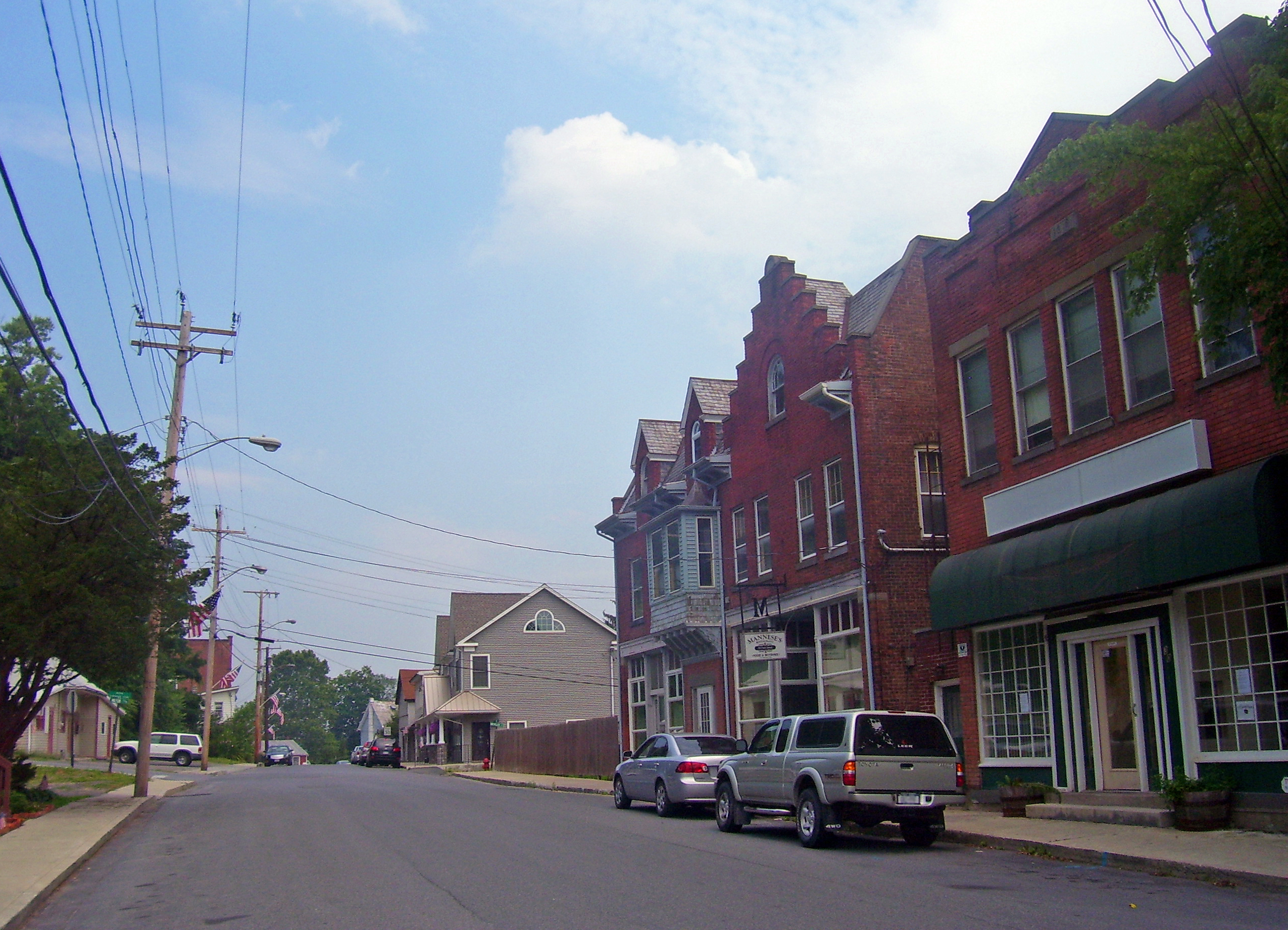
- Main Street

- Location in Ulster County and the state of New York.
- Coordinates: 41°39′32″N 73°57′36″W
- Country: United States
- State: New York
- Region: Hudson Valley
- County: Ulster

Area
  - Total: 2.8 sq mi (7.3 km^{2})
  - Land: 2.08 sq mi (5.4 km^{2})
  - Water: 0.35 sq mi (0.91 km^{2})
- Elevation: 180 ft (55 m)

Population (2020)
  - Total: 1,650
  - Density: 793/sq mi (306/km^{2})
- Time zone: UTC-5 (Eastern)
  - Summer (DST): UTC-4 (Eastern Daylight Time)
- ZIP Code: 12547
- Area code: 845
- Website: Milton & Marlboro

Milton is a hamlet (and census-designated place) in Ulster County, New York, United States. The population was 1,650 at the 2020 census. The locale was named after John Milton, an English poet.

The community of Milton is located in the northeastern part of the town of Marlborough.

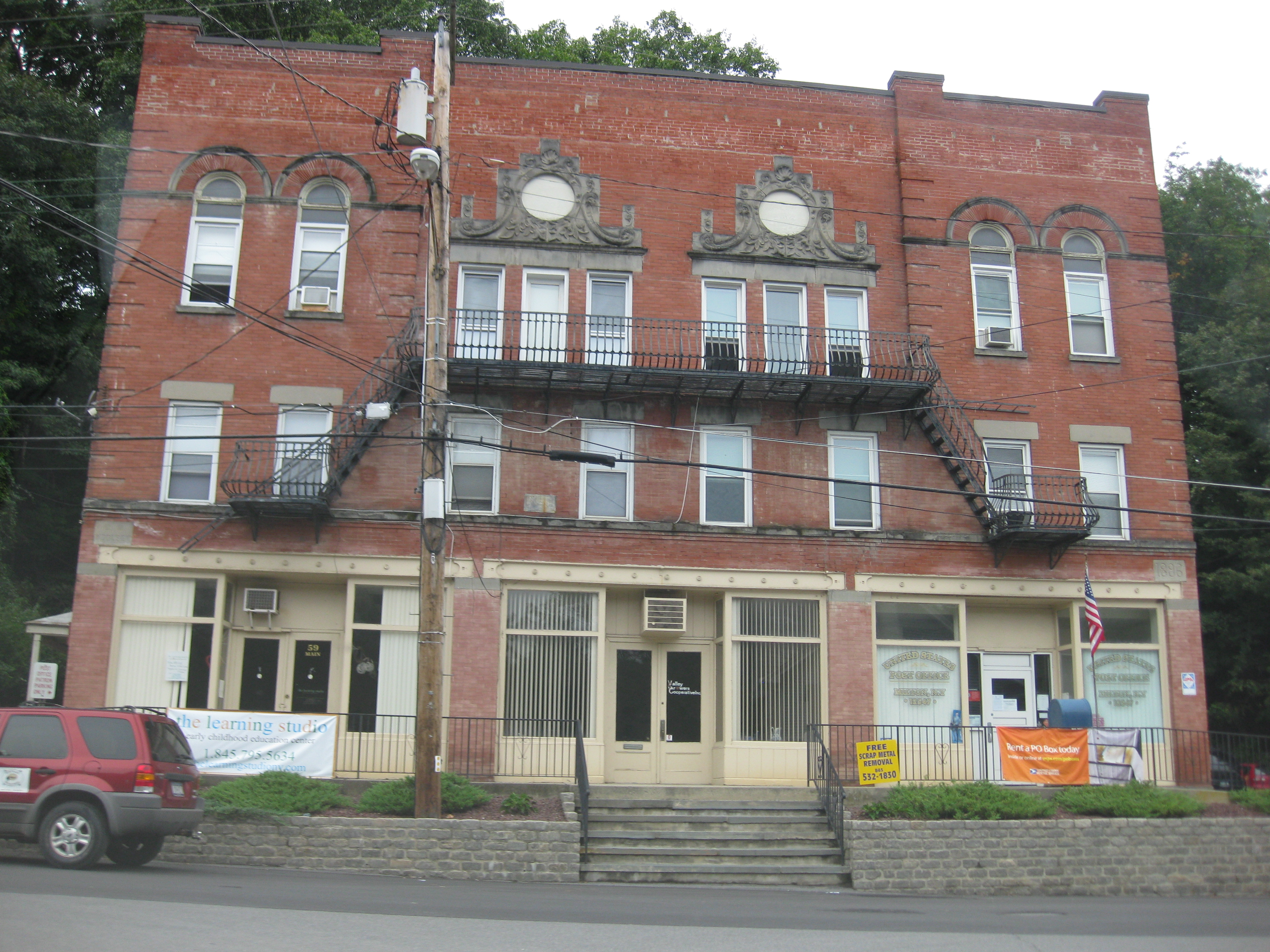
Milton Post Office

== History ==
Captain William Bond was the first settler of record in the area of Milton, having obtained a patent from Queen Anne on June 12, 1712, which patent reserved the right to any trees fit for masts, planks, or otherwise suitable for her majesty's navy. Although Bond followed the sea, he served as deputy surveyor in Marlborough in 1717. Edward Hallock was a seafaring man who owned several vessels, all but one being destroyed by French cruisers. He and his family relocated from Long Island to Milton in late December 1760, and subsequently purchased land from Captain Bond's daughter Sukie. Hallock was a preacher in the Society of Friends.

In 1770 Captain Anning Smith constructed a small square dock on the river, where he built a wooden mill. The road leading to it, called the King's highway, was one of the first roads opened for the settlers living farther inland. Around 1845 the "old dock" came into possession of investors from Poughkeepsie, who established a factory for the manufacture of pins. Sloops were built and launched near here. In 1844 Sumner Colman started a wheel-barrow factory at the pin factory dock. In 1880 Henry H. Bell, from Long Island, started a plush and glove-lining factory at the site of the old pin factory. This later expanded to include the site of the former wheelbarrow factory which had burned in 1852.

In 1802 Charles Millard had two sawmills specializing in white pine. In the summer timber arrived in rafts sent down river from Glens Falls, Fort Edward, and around Lake Champlain. In winter most of the lumber was shipped from the east side of the river hauled by teams over the ice. In 1824 Charles Millard moved across the river to New Hamburg, establishing a lumber yard there. His son Walter carried on the business on the west side. Millard and Mills' steamboat Splendid sailed daily from the Milton dock.

James Hall and Jacob Rowley ran auger factories in Milton at an early date. In 1822 Moses Birdsall ran a hat factory. Jesse I. Conklin had a general store, one of three in the village. The National Pioneer was published at Milton in 1830, by Daniel S. Tuthill. Sands and Lockwood maintained a freight line to New York. William Carpenter, whose ancestors hailed from Wales, came to Milton around 1853 from Plattekill. Carpenter practiced surveying and had a fruit farm. In 1863 L. Harrison Smith opened a coal and lumber yard at Milton landing.

The Milton Railroad Station was listed on the National Register of Historic Places in 2007.

=== Churches ===
==== United Methodist ====
Circuit riders served the Methodists in this village as far back as 1786. Meetings were held in the home of James Perry. On November 16, 1812 the Milton M.E. Society was incorporated. A church building was erected on the former Sands property. The Milton Methodist Church is the oldest Methodist building in Ulster County. It remained a circuit station until 1858 D.W.C Van Gaasbeck became the first pastor. The Marlboro Methodists joined the Milton Methodists in 1982 to form one congregation. In 2012 the community celebrated its 200th anniversary.

==== St. James Roman Catholic Church ====
Irish Catholics began to arrive in Milton around 1850. To hear Mass they had to go by horse-boat to a place called "The Hollow" near Wappingers Falls. Some went to Poughkeepsie. In 1865 Milton became a mission of Rosendale and was attended every two or three weeks by a Father O'Toole and later by Rev. Patrick Brady. In 1867 Rev. Michael Phelan of Port Ewan purchased the old Methodist meeting house in Marlboro where Mass was said for Catholics of Marlboro and Milton. In 1874 Rev. James Francis Mee was appointed first resident pastor in Milton with missions at Marboro and Ireland Corners (otherwise known as Gardiner).

In 1882 Father Mee purchased land for a Catholic cemetery in Lattintown, interments having been made previously in a cemetery near Poughkeepsie. Upon Mee's transfer to Rye in 1886, his successor, Rev. James L. Hoey also took charge of the missions in Marlboro and Roseton. Father Richard B. Cushion served from November 1909 to May 1913. Cushion is remembered for having been particularly attentive to the needs of the Italian members of the congregation. They initially came to the area as farm laborers picking berries; many went on to become permanent farmers and fruit dealers.

== Geography ==
The community is on the west bank of the Hudson River.

Milton is located at 41°39′32″N 73°57′36″W (41.658765, -73.960010).

According to the United States Census Bureau, the CDP has a total area of 2.8 square miles (7.3 km^{2}), of which 2.8 square miles (7.3 km^{2}) is land and 0.35% is water.

== Demographics ==
Historical population
Census	Pop.	Note	%±
2000	1,251		—
2010	1,403		12.2%
2020	1,650		17.6%
U.S. Decennial Census

As of the census of 2000, there were 1,251 people, 458 households, and 317 families residing in the CDP. The population density was 440.3 inhabitants per square mile (170.0/km^{2}). There were 481 housing units at an average density of 169.3 per square mile (65.4/km^{2}). The racial makeup of the CDP was 93.37% white, 3.2% African American, .16% Native American, .40% Asian, 1.44% from other races, and 1.44% from two or more races. Hispanic or Latino of any race were 3.76% of the population.

There were 458 households, out of which 36.9% had children under the age of 18 living with them, 53.7% were married couples living together, 9.8% had a female householder with no husband present, and 30.6% were non-families. 22.5% of all households were made up of individuals, and 8.3% had someone living alone who was 65 years of age or older. The average household size was 2.73 and the average family size was 3.24.

In the CDP, the population was spread out, with 26.8% under the age of 18, 7.1% from 18 to 24, 31.6% from 25 to 44, 24.7% from 45 to 64, and 9.8% who were 65 years of age or older. The median age was 38 years. For every 100 females, there were 97.3 males. For every 100 females age 18 and over, there were 99.6 males.

The median income for a household in the CDP was $54,792, and the median income for a family was $62,625. Males had a median income of $39,750 versus $31,573 for females. The per capita income for the CDP was $23,785. About 1.0% of families and 5.1% of the population were below the poverty line, including 2.9% of those under age 18 and none of those age 65 or over.

== Education ==
The CDP is in Marlboro Central School District.

== The Fugitive Kind ==
In 1959, the feature film The Fugitive Kind, starring Marlon Brando and Anna Magnani, was filmed in Milton. The main street was temporarily redone to resemble an old town in the deep south. The motion picture, based on a play by Tennessee Williams, was directed by Sidney Lumet.

== Notable people ==
- Mary Hallock Foote (1847–1938), author and illustrator of short stories about the American West
- Frank Skartados (1956–2018), New York state assemblyman
- Warren White (1844–1890), Union Army Civil War veteran and early Major League Baseball player
- Connie Ray, (b. 1956), television, film and stage actor
