= Syracuse, Ontario and New York Railway =

Railway in New York

Overview
- Headquarters: New York, New York
- Locale: Syracuse, New York to Earlville
- Dates of operation: 1883–1891
- Successor: West Shore Railroad later part of New York Central Railroad (NYCRR)

Technical
- Track gauge: 4 ft 8 1/2 in (1,435 mm) standard gauge

The Syracuse, Ontario and New York Railway was founded in 1883 and had a line that ran between Syracuse, New York and Earlville, New York, a distance of 45.5 miles (73.2 km). The company formed from the Syracuse, Chenango and New York Railroad Company. Beginning on July 1, 1890, it operated as the Chenango County, New York branch of the West Shore Railroad. On April 2, 1891, the railroad and property of the Syracuse Ontario and New York Railway Company were formally leased, for the term of its corporate existence, to the West Shore Railroad Company on June 30, 1891. Later, ownership was transferred to the New York Central Railroad (NYCRR).

== History ==
The Syracuse, Ontario and New York Railway was formed by articles of association filed in the office of the Secretary of State of New York on June 20, 1883. This last-named company subsequently acquired by agreement of purchase the railroad, which had been sold under foreclosure, formerly belonging to the Syracuse, Chenango and New York Railroad, extending from the city of Syracuse in Onondaga County to the village of Earlville in Madison County.

The Syracuse, Chenango and New York Railroad was incorporated April 7, 1877, as successor of the Syracuse and Chenango Railroad, which was incorporated May 14, 1873, and sold March 17, 1877. The Syracuse and Chenango Company was the successor of Syracuse and Chenango Valley Railroad, incorporated April 16, 1868, road opened February 1873, and sold July 8, 1873.

=== Company management ===
By December 1888, directors were Albert Allen of Elmira, New York, Ashbel Green of Tenafly, New Jersey, Walter Katte, Herbert E. Kinney, James D. Layng, Henry Monett, James W. Musson, Donald B. Toucey, Albert B. Taylor, William C. Taylor, William H. Sanford, all of New York City and Archy McCulloh and Joseph P. Ord of Englewood, New Jersey.

Ashbel Green was president, Joseph P. Ord was secretary and treasurer and J. D. Layng was general manager. Principal office and business address was 5 Vanderbilt Avenue in New York City.

The company had four locomotive engines, seven passenger cars, four baggage, mail and express cars, 81 freight cars including box and platform and 15 service cars for a total of 107 cars.

=== Sylvan Beach excursion ===
During August 1902, the rail offered special excursions to Sylvan Beach and according to the local newspaper; "This is a splendid opportunity for residents of Syracuse to visit that far-famed resort."

Passengers would leave the city at 8:30am and arrive in Central Square where connection could be made to Sylvan Beach. The rate was 70 cents round trip with return trip at 9:35pm.
