= Fullers, New York =

- Hamlet
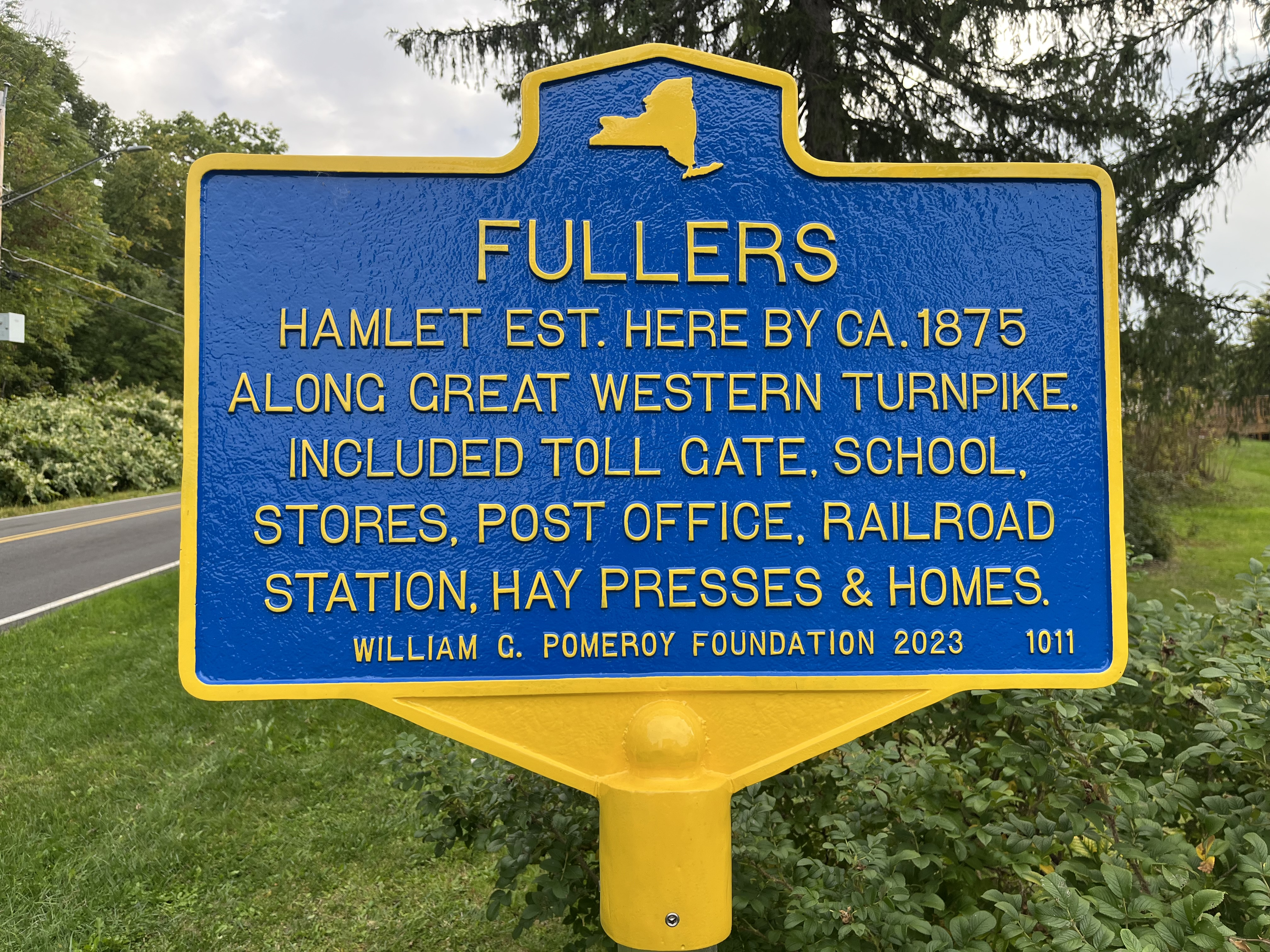
- Sign at the intersection of Fuller Station Rd and Western Turnpike

- Location within New York Location within the United States
- Coordinates: 42°43′32″N 73°57′40″W
- Country: United States
- State: New York
- Region: Capital District
- County: Albany
- Town: Guilderland
- Named after: Major John Fuller, landowner
- Time zone: UTC-5 (EST)
  - Summer (DST): UTC-4 (EDT)
- ZIP Code: 12009 (Altamont)
- Area code: 518

Fullers is a hamlet in the town of Guilderland, Albany County, New York, United States. The hamlet lies along U.S. Route 20 (Western Turnpike).

== History ==
Fullers owes its origins, name, and early growth to the Fuller family. Major John Fuller of the New York State Militia owned a homestead and tavern here, and the station of the West Shore Railroad, along with the post office, were called Fuller's Station in his honor. His son, Aaron Fuller, Guilderland town supervisor and New York State Assemblyman, is credited with using his great influence and effort on growing the hamlet. Fuller was the only Democrat elected as town supervisor for over a century.

In 1799, the Great Western Turnpike was built, connecting Albany with the western frontier and in 1882, the West Shore Railroad would build its tracks crossing the turnpike on its way from Ravena and Voorheesville to Schenectady. The Fullers Station would be built on Fullers Station Road, southwest of the turnpike. Also on Fullers Station Road was the Fullers post office; this post office was located in the Van Allen General Store. Fullers even had its own one room school house, Guilderland District Number 13. After attending primary education here, the students would have to pay $7.50 a month to travel the railroad to Ravena for high school. The post office was discontinued in 1918, and today Fullers receives its mail from Altamont. In 1927, the railroad station was also discontinued when the Western Turnpike was lowered to allow for the West Shore Railroad's tracks to be carried over by a bridge.

== Geography ==
As a hamlet, the borders of Fullers are indeterminate. Generally, Fuller is the area around U.S. Route 20, known as Western Turnpike, at the intersection with Fuller Station Road; where the CSXT railroad crosses US 20.
