= Jersey City and Albany Railway =

Overview
- Dates of operation: 1878–1881
- Predecessor: Jersey City and Albany Railroad
- Successor: North River Railroad

Technical
- Track gauge: 1,435 mm (4 ft 8 1/2 in)
- Length: 26.2 miles (42.2 km)

The Jersey City and Albany Railway was a railway company in the United States. It was incorporated in 1878 to acquire the property of the bankrupt Jersey City and Albany Railroad. It extended that company's line 13 miles (21 km) north, from Tappan, New York, to Haverstraw, New York. The company was consolidated with the North River Railway in 1881 to form the North River Railroad. Its line eventually became part of the West Shore Railroad main line.

== History ==
The Jersey City and Albany Railroad completed a 13-mile (21 km) line between Ridgefield, New Jersey, and Tappan, New York, in 1873. The New Jersey Midland Railway, a predecessor of the New York, Susquehanna and Western Railway, operated the line under contract. Both companies subsequently entered receivership. The New York and New Jersey portions were sold separately, but both to Delos E. Culver. Two new companies were established in 1878, one in each state, and both called Jersey City and Albany Railway. The two were consolidated into a single company on January 28, 1879.

The new company built an additional 13.1 miles (21.1 km) of track, extending the line north from Tappan to Haverstraw, New York. Construction was delayed by the crossing of the Erie Railroad in Orangeburg, New York, and by challenges with constructing tracks over a peat bog. The extension opened on March 1, 1880. The company was consolidated with the North River Railway on May 5, 1881, to form the North River Railroad.
