= Jersey City and Albany Railroad =

Overview
- Dates of operation: 1873–1877
- Predecessors: Ridgefield Park Railroad; Rockland County Railroad
- Successor: Jersey City and Albany Railway

Technical
- Track gauge: 1,435 mm (4 ft 8 1/2 in)
- Length: 13 miles (21 km)

The Jersey City and Albany Railroad was a railway company in the United States. It was incorporated in 1873 and that year completed a 13-mile (21 km) line between Ridgefield, New Jersey, and Tappan, New York. The company was reorganized as the Jersey City and Albany Railway in 1878. Its line eventually became part of the West Shore Railroad main line.

== History ==
The Ridgefield Park Railroad was incorporated on April 4, 1867, and began building a 13-mile (21 km) line between Ridgefield, New Jersey, and Tappan, New York, on the New Jersey/New York border. The Rockland Central Railroad was incorporated on May 23, 1870, to build north from Tappan through Rockland County, New York, toward Albany, New York. These two companies were consolidated on June 14, 1873, to form the Jersey City and Albany Railroad. At the time of consolidation the Ridgefield Park Railroad had not yet opened its line, nor had the Rockland Central Railroad laid any track.

The Jersey City and Albany Railroad began operations on July 30, 1873. The New Jersey Midland Railway, a predecessor of the New York, Susquehanna and Western Railway, operated the line under contract. Both companies subsequently entered receivership. The New York and New Jersey parts of the Jersey City and Albany Railroad were sold separately, and reunified as the Jersey City and Albany Railway. The New Jersey and New York sales were effective on June 22 and November 23, 1877, respectively.
