= West Shore Railroad main line =

West Shore Railroad Main Line
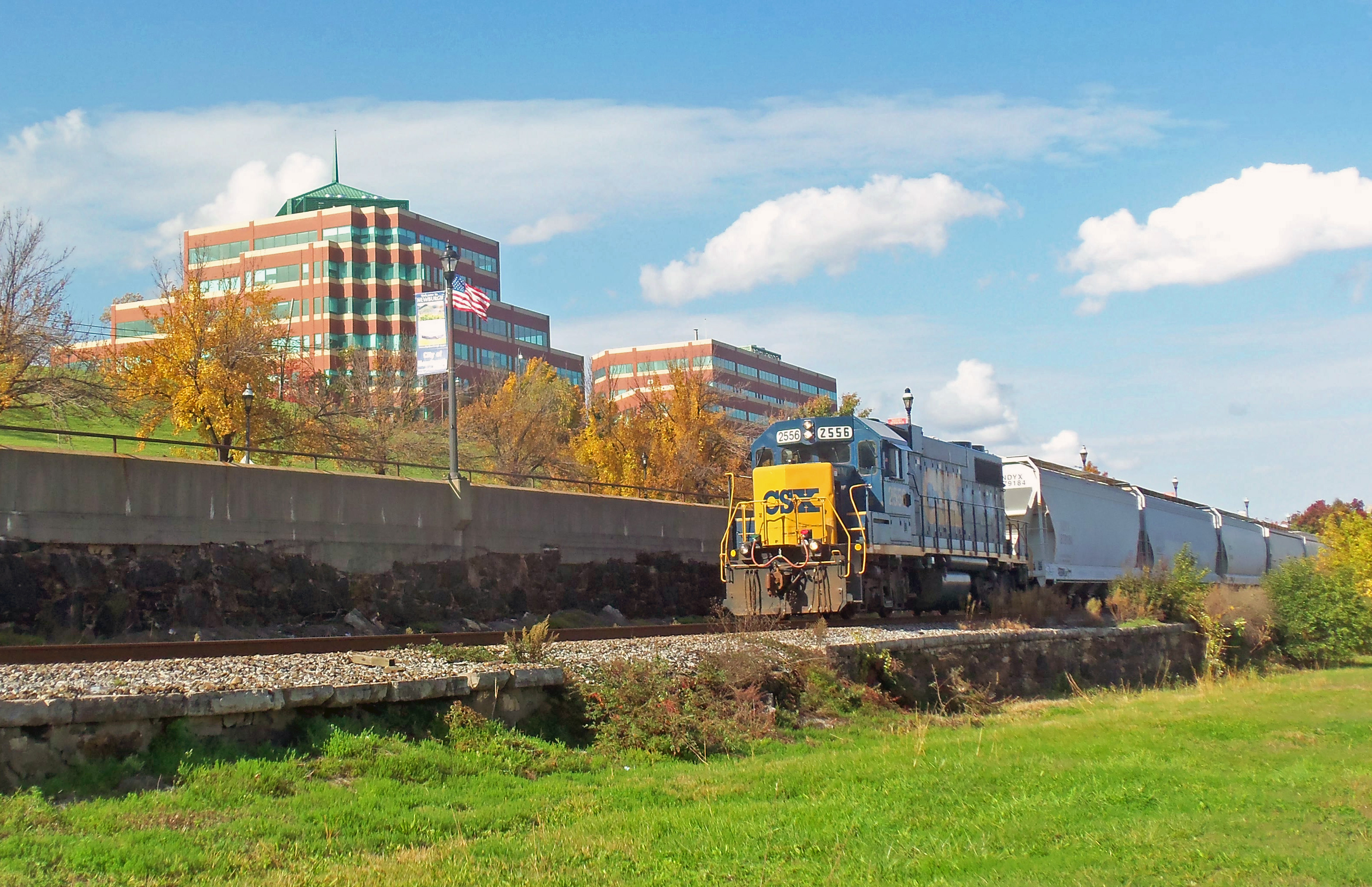
- Southbound train on River Subdivision at Newburgh

Overview
- Owner: CSX Transportation
- Locale: New Jersey; New York
- Termini: Weehawken, New Jersey; Buffalo, New York

History
- Opened: July 30, 1873

Technical
- Line length: 423 mi (681 km)
- Track gauge: 1,435 mm (4 ft 8 1/2 in) standard gauge

The Main Line of the West Shore Railroad is a partially-abandoned railway line in the states of New Jersey and New York. At its fullest extent, it ran from Weehawken Terminal on the Hudson River to Buffalo, New York. It runs roughly parallel to the former main line of the New York Central Railroad and was originally built as a competitor to that line, but was acquired by the New York Central Railroad and used primarily as a freight line. Much of the line has been abandoned but several sections remain in use, including most of the line on the west side of the Hudson between Weehawken and Albany.

== History ==
=== Saratoga and Hudson River Railroad ===
The oldest part of the West Shore Railroad main line is the former main line of the Saratoga and Hudson River Railroad, later the Athens Branch of the New York Central Railroad. Daniel Drew founded the Saratoga and Hudson River Railroad in 1864 to further his steamboat interests on the Hudson River. The company completed a 37-mile (60 km) line between Schenectady, New York, and Athens, New York, in March 1866. The New York Central leased the company in 1867; the New York, West Shore and Buffalo Railway leased the line between Coxsackie, New York and Fullers, New York, on December 2, 1881. The company used it as a second main line track.

=== Jersey City and Albany Railroad ===
The Ridgefield Park Railroad was incorporated in 1867 and began building a 13-mile (21 km) line between Ridgefield, New Jersey, and Tappan, New York. This line was completed by the Jersey City and Albany Railroad on July 30, 1873. The New Jersey Midland Railway, a predecessor of the New York, Susquehanna and Western Railway, operated the line under contract. After a period of receivership, the line was sold to the new Jersey City and Albany Railway in 1878.

=== Jersey City and Albany Railway ===
The Jersey City and Albany Railway was incorporated in 1878 to acquire the property of the Jersey City and Albany Railroad. The new company pushed the line north from Tappen to Haverstraw, New York, an additional 13.1 miles (21.1 km). The extension opened on March 1, 1880.

=== New York, West Shore and Buffalo Railway ===
The next and most significant expansion of the line took place under the New York, West Shore and Buffalo Railway, which was established in 1880. This new company had powerful financial backing and was developed as a competitor of the New York Central and Hudson River Railroad. The company extended its main line an additional 391.6 miles (630.2 km) from Haverstraw to Buffalo, New York. The line was completed in 1883. The New York Central established the West Shore Railroad in 1885 to acquire the New York, West Shore and Buffalo Railway, including its main line.

=== West Shore Railroad ===
The West Shore Railroad remained the titular owner of the West Shore Railroad main line until June 20, 1952, when it, along with several other subsidiaries, was formally merged into the New York Central Railroad. The most significant change to the line during that period was realignment of the New York Central's lines through Syracuse, New York. The New York Central's main passenger line ran down the middle of Washington Street, posing a hazard to pedestrians and motorists. The West Shore line ran several blocks to the north, between Burnet and Canal. The New York Central constructed a new three-track line, elevated on an embankment, on the right-of-way of the West Shore line. This new line, including a new passenger station, opened on September 24, 1936.

=== New York Central Railroad and Penn Central ===
Beginning in 1955, the New York Central gradually abandoned portions of the West Shore Railroad main line between Albany and Buffalo as it implemented centralized traffic control (CTC) to consolidate through traffic (freight and passenger) on its original main line. The line ceased being a through route as the New York Central abandoned 114 miles (183 km) between 1955 and 1963:

- New York Mills–Vernon in 1964, 12 miles (19 km)
- East Syracuse–Canastota in 1955, 20 miles (32 km)
- Amboy–Wayneport in 1959, 60 miles (97 km)
- Chili Junction–Byron in 1959, 12 miles (19 km)
- Byron–Oakfield in 1963, 10 miles (16 km)

In addition, the New York Central sold the elevated right-of-way through Syracuse, built in 1936, to the state of New York in 1962 for the construction of Interstate 690. The New York Central merged with the Pennsylvania Railroad in 1968 to form the Penn Central Transportation Company. The new company entered bankruptcy two years later, eventually leading to the creation of Conrail in 1976. Before that happened, Penn Central abandoned two more parts of the line:

- Little Falls–Canajoharie in 1973, roughly 20 miles (32 km)
- Little Falls–Ilion in 1974, 9.5 miles (15.3 km)

=== Conrail ===
Most–but not all–of the remaining line was conveyed to Conrail in 1976. This included the entire line between Weehawken and Selkirk Yard, now known as the River Line. West of Albany, sections between Selkirk and Rotterdam Junction, Ilion and New York Mills, Vernon and Canastota, Wayneport and Chili Junction, and Oakfield and Buffalo were also included. The line between Rotterdam Junction and South Fort Plain was not conveyed but Conrail operated it under subsidy from the state of New York. This line was abandoned in 1981. Conrail abandoned the section between Ilion and Utica in 1982, and between Oakfield and Buffalo, the Oakfield Secondary, in 1984. The first bit of the River Line, splitting from the P&H Line and passing over the National Docks, was built fairly-recently as a connecting track. North of there, the line was the New Jersey Junction Railroad to the Weehawken tunnel. Through the tunnel, it was the West Shore Railroad. Both of these lines were owned by the New York Central Railroad.

The Weehawken Branch was built and owned by the Erie Railroad. It originally passed through the middle of Hoboken, but was later realigned to the west side, right next to the New Jersey Junction Railroad.

In 1989, Conrail agreed to sell the line south of North Bergen Yard along with part of the former New Jersey Junction Railroad to NJ Transit for what became the Hudson-Bergen Light Rail project. NJ Transit took ownership in 1995, and Conrail abandoned service in 2000. With the breakup of Conrail in 1999, the remaining parts of the West Shore line were conveyed to CSX Transportation.

== Current operations ==
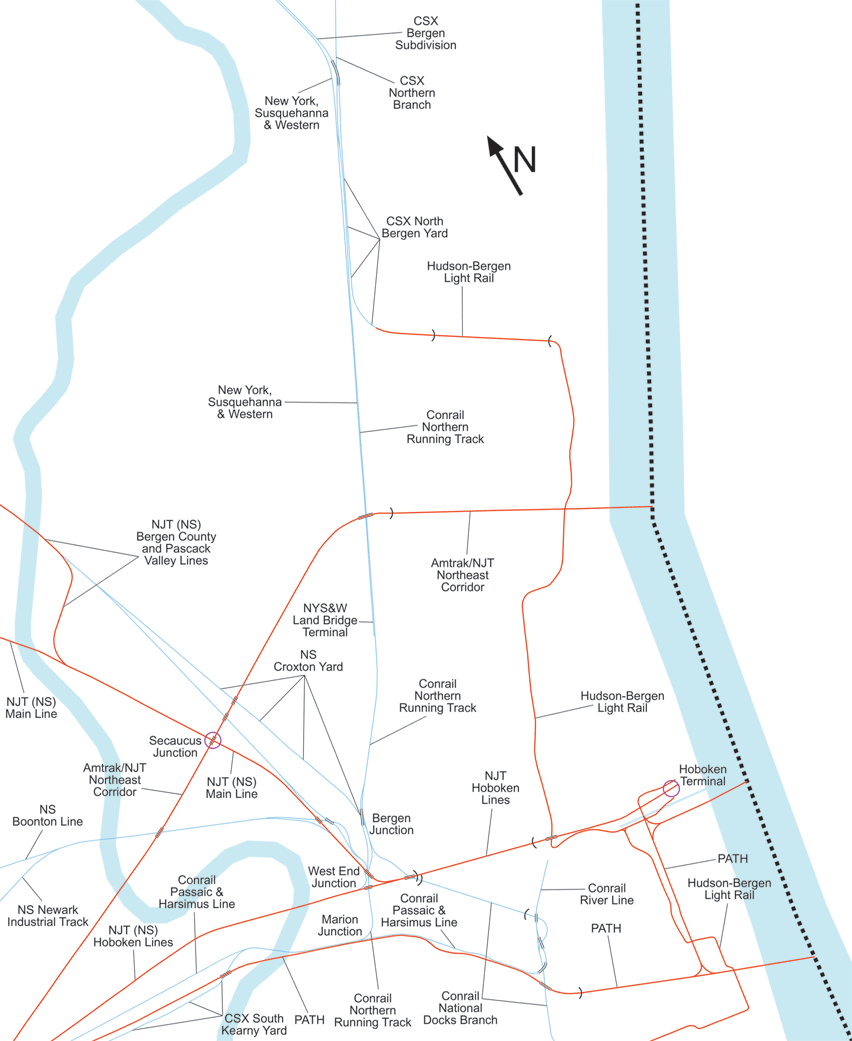
Current railroads of northern Hudson County, New Jersey, including the portions of the West Shore main line that are now part of the CSX River Subdivision and the Hudson-Bergen Light Rail

=== River Subdivision ===
Under CSX operation, the line between North Bergen Yard and Selkirk is known as the River Subdivision. It is approximately 130 miles (210 km) long. At the southern end it connects with the Northern Branch in North Bergen, New Jersey. In Selkirk it connects with the Castleton Subdivision, leading east across the Hudson River or west into Selkirk Yard.

The line is used for the transport of Bakken oil. The line uses rail cars that are considered inadequate and a safety hazard, calling for more regulations and oversight from the towns through which the River Subdivision passes. In February 2016, competitive federal funding for rail improvements was not awarded to the line.

=== Selkirk Subdivision ===
Under CSX operation, the line between Selkirk and Hoffmans is known as the Selkirk Subdivision. West of Hoffmans, the subdivision also includes part of the former New York Central Railroad main line between Hoffmans and Kellogg's Yard, east of Amsterdam. It is approximately 34 miles (55 km) long. At its southeastern end it connects with the Castleton Subdivision at the west end of Selkirk Yard. It connects with the Carman Subdivision in Rotterdam before crossing the Mohawk River at Hoffmans, where it meets the Hudson Subdivision coming up from Schenectady. The line proceeds west along the north side of the Mohawk before reaching Kellogg's Yard, outside Amsterdam, where it becomes the Mohawk Subdivision. Amtrak's Empire Service, Lake Shore Limited, and Maple Leaf trains operate over the Selkirk Subdivision northwest of Hoffmans.

=== West Shore Subdivision ===
Under CSX operation, the line between Fairport and Churchville is known as the West Shore Subdivision or West Shore Branch. It connects at both ends with the Rochester Subdivision, providing a southern bypass around the city of Rochester. At Genesee Junction, the line has an interchange with the Livonia, Avon and Lakeville Railroad and the Rochester and Southern Railroad. The subdivision is approximately 21 miles (34 km) long.

== See also ==
- List of CSX Transportation lines
- West Shore Railroad
- National Docks Secondary
