= Danforth Avenue station =

Light rail station in Bayonne, New Jersey

Danforth Avenue
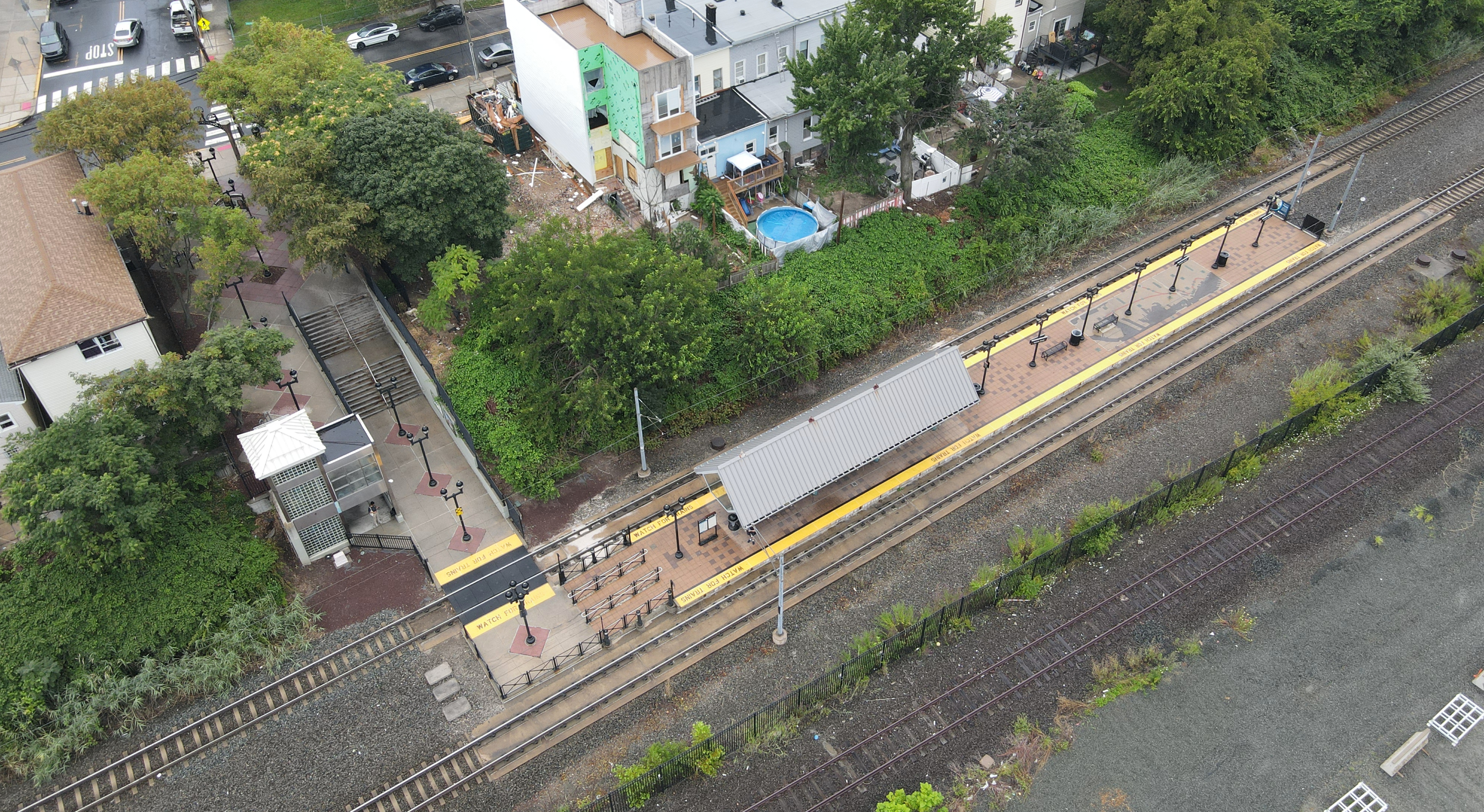
- Danforth Avenue station

General information
- Location: Princeton Avenue and Danforth Avenue; Jersey City, New Jersey
- Coordinates: 40°41′33″N 74°05′14″W
- Owner: New Jersey Transit
- Platforms: 1 island platform
- Tracks: 2
- Connections: NJ Transit Bus: 6, 9, 10, 80, 81, 87

Construction
- Cycle facilities: Yes
- Accessible: Yes

Other information
- Fare zone: 1

History
- Opened: April 15, 2000

Passengers
- 2025: 1,248 (average weekday)
- Rank: 21 of 24

Services
Preceding station	NJ Transit	Following station
45th Street toward 8th Street	Bayonne–Hoboken	Richard Street toward Hoboken
Bayonne Flyer does not stop here
Former services
Preceding station	Central Railroad of New Jersey	Following station
East 45th Street toward Somerville	Somerville – Jersey City Local Greenville	Jersey City Terminus
East 45th Street toward Elizabethport	Suburban service to Elizabethport	Van Nostrand Place toward Jersey City
Location

Danforth Avenue station is a station on the Hudson–Bergen Light Rail (HBLR) in Jersey City, New Jersey. The station is located at the intersection of Danforth Avenue and Princeton Avenue in Greenville.

== History ==
=== CNJ station ===
Danforth Avenue station is located north of the site of the former Central Railroad of New Jersey Greenville station. The former Greenville stop was located along the right of way at Linden Avenue, south of the current bridge over the railroad. The station opened on August 1, 1864 as part of a dummy railroad between the future Communipaw Terminal and Bergen Point until the CRRNJ Newark Bay Bridge was built across Newark Bay. A station built in 1866 at that location burned down on May 11, 1869, and replaced with a two-story wooden depot that was 21 by 51 feet (6.4 m × 15.5 m) large. The later station depot lasted until 1964, when it was razed in favor of a shelter. Passenger service to Greenville ended on April 30, 1967, when the Aldene Plan went into effect, moving CNJ commuter services through Newark Penn Station via the Lehigh Valley Railroad. Service through Bayonne was truncated from Communipaw Terminal to CNJ's East 33rd Street station.

=== HBLR station ===
The current station opened on April 15, 2000, as part of the original operating segment of the HBLR. A public art exhibition entitled Immigrant Remnants consists of concrete sculptures of luggage, with an accompanying plaque displaying a tongue-in-cheek newspaper article that suggests the sculptures are petrified remains of actual luggage discovered during construction of the station.

== Station layout ==
The station has a single island platform with a shelter for the local trains of the Hudson–Bergen Light Rail between 8th Street station in Bayonne and Hoboken Terminal. Like its counterparts, the Danforth Avenue station is fully accessible for handicapped people under the Americans with Disabilities Act of 1990, with elevators and proper platform levels.

== Bibliography ==
- Papers Read Before the Historical Society of Hudson County. Jersey City, New Jersey: Historical Society of Hudson County. 1908.
- Bernhart, Benjamin L. (2004). Historic Journeys By Rail: Central Railroad of New Jersey Stations, Structures & Marine Equipment. Outer Station Project. ISBN 1-891402-07-2.
