= 45th Street station (Hudson–Bergen Light Rail) =

Hudson–Bergen Light Rail station

45th Street
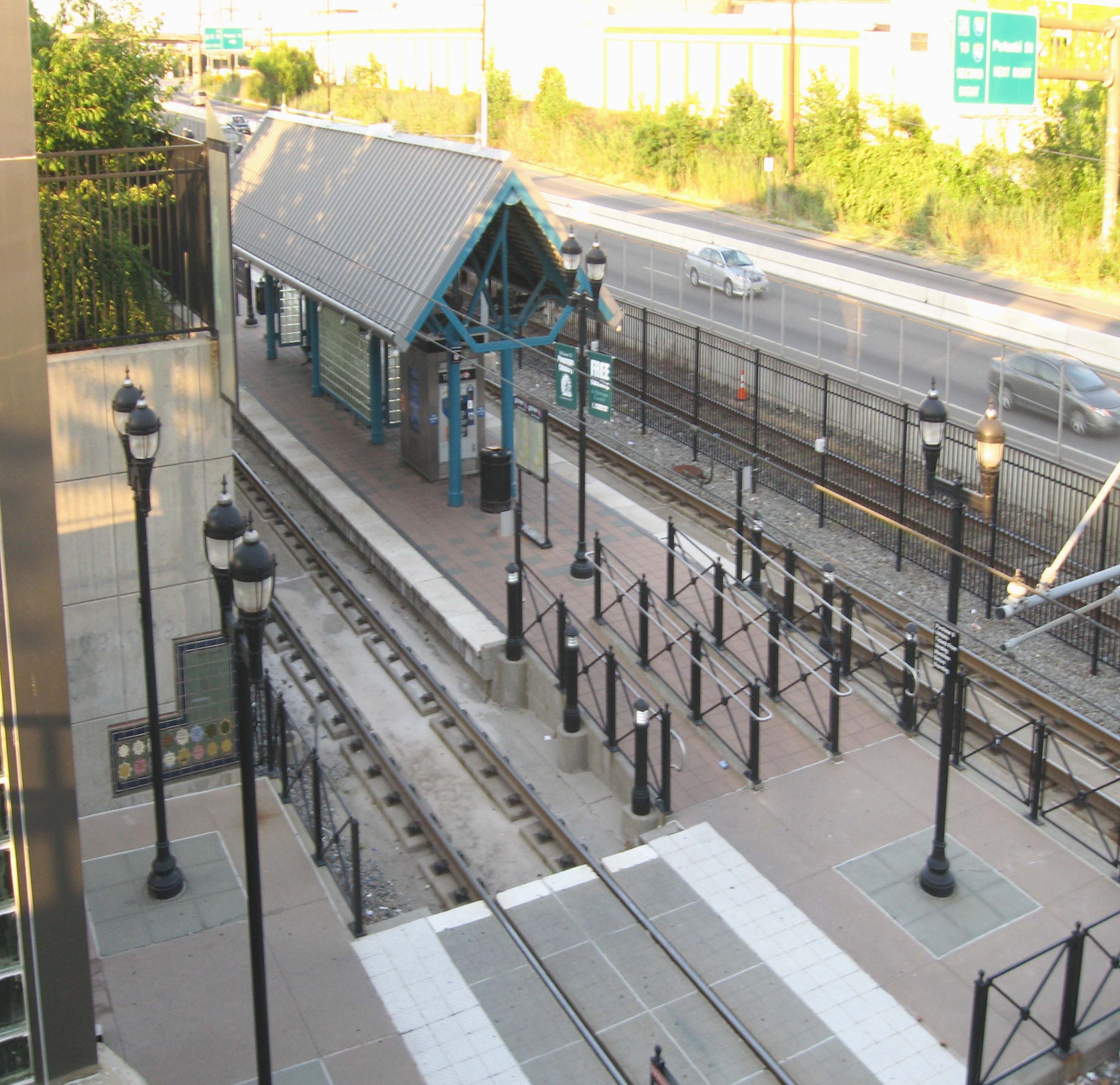
- 45th Street station seen from the East Centre Street bridge. Route 440 is in the background.

General information
- Location: Avenue E at East 45th Street; Bayonne, New Jersey
- Coordinates: 40°40′41″N 74°06′07″W
- Owner: New Jersey Transit
- Platforms: 1 island platform
- Tracks: 2
- Connections: NJ Transit Bus: 12

Construction
- Structure type: At-grade
- Cycle facilities: Yes
- Accessible: Yes

Other information
- Fare zone: 1

History
- Opened: April 15, 2000

Passengers
- 2025: 1,468 (average weekday)
- Rank: 17 of 24

Services
Preceding station	NJ Transit	Following station
34th Street toward 8th Street	Bayonne–Hoboken	Danforth Avenue toward Hoboken
34th Street toward 8th Street	Bayonne Flyer	Liberty State Park toward Hoboken
Location

45th Street station is an active light rail station on the Hudson–Bergen Light Rail (HBLR) in Bayonne, New Jersey. Located next to Avenue E and East 45th Street (along with Route 440), it is the northernmost station of four in Bayonne. 45th Street station contains a single island platform, with two tracks (one on each side). The stop also contains a single overhang for weather protection with windscreens. It also contains an elevator, reaching street level to the Avenue E and East Centre Street junction, helping make the stop accessible to handicapped persons. Trains through 45th Street station operate between 8th Street station in Bayonne and Hoboken Terminal in Hoboken. There also is an express service, known as the Bayonne Flyer, which operates between the same terminals, but skips local stops between 45th Street and Essex Street station, along with Harsimus Cove station.

45th Street station is built at the site of the former Central Railroad of New Jersey station at the same junction. The station replaced a former stop located at East 49th Street (known originally as Pamrapo, followed by the eponymous East 49th Street). The East 45th Street station opened on April 3, 1918, when they moved it 700 feet (210 m) west. After a failed attempt to close the station outright in January–March 1954, the railroad eliminated the agent. The station depot at East 45th Street station came down in 1961 when the railroad replaced the Center Street Bridge as part of construction of Route 169. Service ended on April 30, 1967 with the implementation of the Aldene Plan, which truncated service from Communipaw Terminal in Jersey City to East 33rd Street station.

Construction of the Hudson–Bergen Light Rail began in 1998. The station opened on April 15, 2000.

== History ==
=== Jersey Central station ===
Railroad service in the Bayonne area began on August 1, 1864 when the Central Railroad of New Jersey began service between Jersey City and Bergen Point. In Bayonne, four stations were opened: Bergen Point (West 8th Street), Centreville (East 22nd Street), the namesake Bayonne (East 33rd Street) and finally, Pamrapo (located at East 49th Street). The station name changed to East 49th Street, denoting the street by 1895. The railroad maintained a two-story, 21-by-51-foot (6.4 m × 15.5 m) wood and brick station depot at the East 49th Street. The Public Utilities Commission on June 1, 1916 approved moving the station 700 feet (210 m) west on the tracks to the East 45th Street and Center Street area. This new station opened on April 3, 1918. The new station at East 45th Street contained two depots. The westbound station was 50 by 20 feet (15.2 m × 6.1 m) while the eastbound depot was 128 by 16 feet (39.0 m × 4.9 m) in design. The railroad retained a 16-by-24-foot (4.9 m × 7.3 m) freight house at East 49th Street.

As part of construction of an interceptor sewer pipe in Bayonne, the city of Bayonne agreed in October 1953 to pay the railroad for the elimination of the eastbound station shelter and stairway at the East 45th Street station. The costs to remove the structures would come to $5,230 (1953 USD) and new replacements would be built once construction ended on the new interceptor sewer. As part of the deal, the railroad would provide all materials and labor for the demolition and replacement, rather than the city or their contractors. Because of the $5,230 being a total produced before construction, the city agreed to pay all cost overruns for the project, but would be refunded for the difference by the railroad.

==== 1954 closing threat ====
On January 15, 1954, the Central Railroad of New Jersey announced plans to eliminate passenger service at the East 45th Street station on April 25, citing low ridership. East 45th Street station in Bayonne would be one of three stops eliminated to help improve service between Jersey City and points west, including the Claremont station in Jersey City and the Aldene station in Union County. Lorraine station in Elizabeth would see a reduction of service. The railroad stated they chose to eliminate East 45th Street due to the proximity of other stations in the area (West 8th, East 22nd and East 33rd). A study of passenger ridership at the four Bayonne stations stated that 789 people used the station daily compared to 1,383 at East 33rd, 1,259 at East 22nd and 4,262 people at the West 8th Street station. However, all plans to close the stations were dependent on a hearing by the New Jersey Public Utilities Commission.

Opposition was immediate and intense. One article in The Bayonne Times stated that while East 45th Street station had the lowest ridership, it also depended on how many trains actually stopped at the station. West 8th Street, which had the highest daily ridership of the four Bayonne stations, had more daily train stops than East 45th Street. The writer also stated that the fare differences between the West 8th and East 45th stops were not insignificant. A weekly train pass from West 8th Street to Jersey City was $3.15 (1954 USD) while a pass from East 45th Street cost only $2.35. Adding the bus fare involved of $1.00, the writer felt that it would drive ridership to buses and using the Hudson and Manhattan Railroad. A four-page pamphlet also came from Central Railroad officials on its train, neglected to mention any improvements in Bayonne and only communities from Elizabeth and west.

The Bayonne Chamber of Commerce voted unanimously on January 20 to pass a resolution decrying the abandonment of the East 45th Street station. Paul Lawler, a local housing commissioner, stated at a Chamber of Commerce luncheon that they would create undue hardship for riders and reduce property values in the area. They also resolved to ensure that they would be present at a Public Utilities Commission hearing. Bayonne Mayor Edward F. Clark vowed on January 21 to fight the decision by the Central Railroad of New Jersey. Clark wrote to the Bayonne City Attorney, Alfred Brenner to protest at the hearing. Clark told Brenner that he felt the 800 citizens of the area who East 45th Street station should not be allowed to suffer for other municipalities' sake.

Civilian opposition to the project also was intense. The January 15 pamphlet, according to one resident, only focused on Elizabeth and municipalities due west and had no interest in anything focused on Bayonne. Another resident wrote to The Bayonne Times, stating that the station had more ridership than the Van Nostrand Place and Greenville stations in Jersey City and that a stop at East 45th Street would not interrupt service west of Elizabeth to any significant degree. This writer also stated that East 45th Street station did not need any significant structures and that shelters would be alright, but that the train stopping there was more important.

East 45th Street
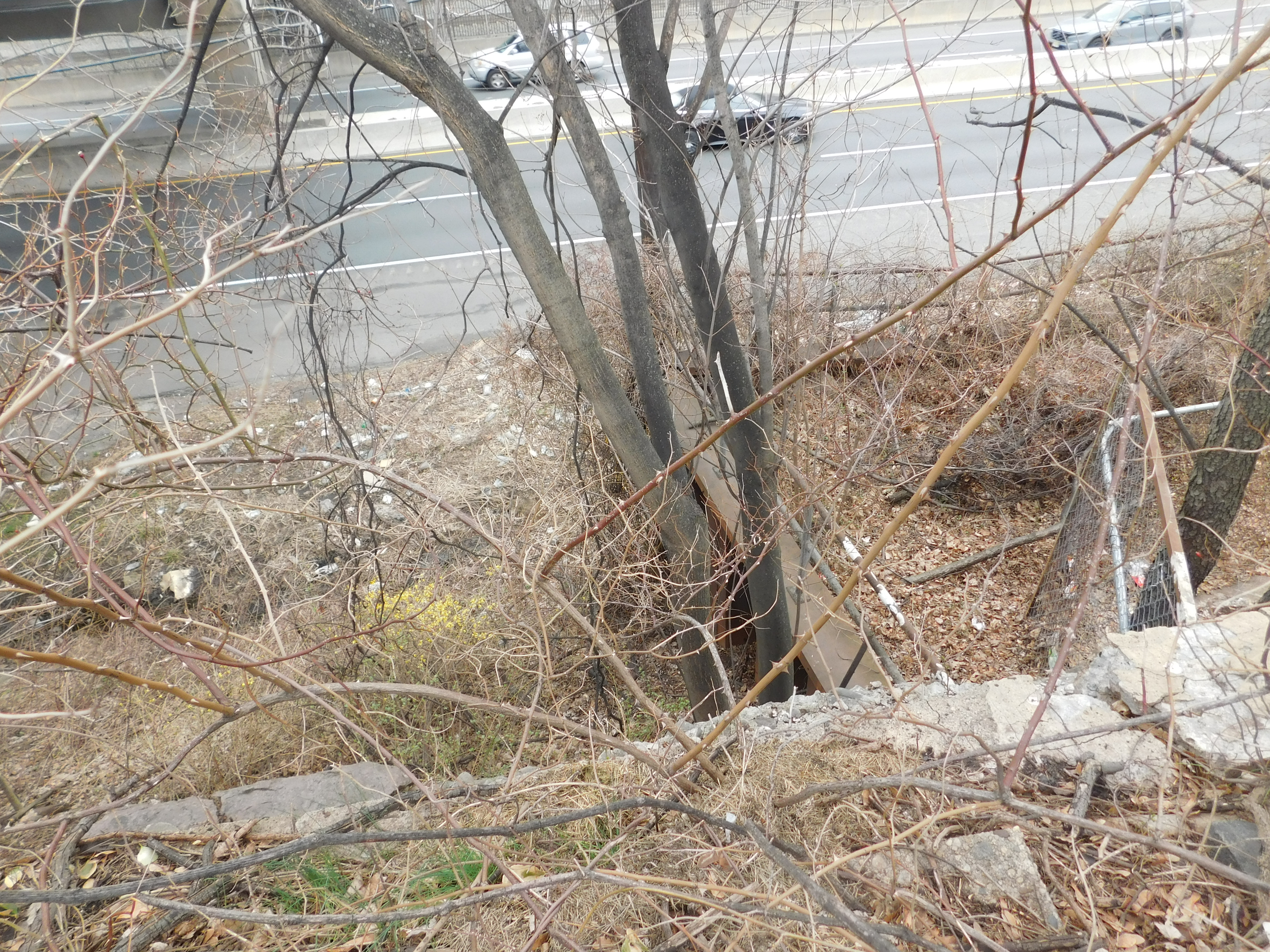
- Remains of the East 45th Street station in March 2026.

General information
- Location: Avenue E at East 45th Street, Bayonne, New Jersey
- Line: Central Railroad of New Jersey Main Line
- Platforms: 2 side platforms
- Tracks: 2

History
- Opened: April 3, 1918
- Closed: April 30, 1967
- Rebuilt: –July 1960

Key dates
- April 25, 1954: Station agent eliminated

Former services
Preceding station	Central Railroad of New Jersey	Following station
East 33rd Street toward Somerville	Somerville – Jersey City Local	Greenville toward Jersey City
East 33rd Street toward Elizabethport	Suburban service to Elizabethport	Greenville toward Jersey City
Location

A resident of West 41st Street stated that the railroad had already gone out of its way to make ridership at East 45th Street more inconvenient, citing that they had to switch to the East 33rd Street station when the railroad eliminated a stop that meets a ferry at 6:30 a.m. The railroad also stopped operating any trains that stopped at East 45th Street station after 6:07 p.m. and that many people coming from New York City would be unable to catch that train due to being out of work after 5:30 p.m. An anonymous resident stated that the railroad also created hazards for the riders by removing one of the stairway exists on the westbound platform and the change of location of the eastbound shelter. They also decried the lack of Bayonne influence on the meeting, stating that the group that created the rail schedules chaired W.F. Scott, the mayor of Somerville. Walter R. Calhoun wrote his own letter directed to Hortense Kessler, the chair of the Public Utilities Commission. Calhoun asked if the Commission could withhold any decisions or orders until local residents obtained a chance to protest the decision. Calhoun felt it necessary to get data for their argument and commuters to form a committee to be heard at the hearing. With the statistics the Central Railroad gave in their pamphlet, Calhoun stated that the closure would cost commuters $0.09 extra per rider.

On January 25, the Bayonne Planning Board made their opposition to the proposal official at a meeting at the 16th Street Firehouse. They stated that the parking facilities at East 33rd Street were sufficient, but the industries surrounding the East 45th Street station need to provide space for to allow parking at the station. They also felt that any development of the Long Docks would result in a long walking commute from East 33rd Street that a stop at East 45th Street would not result in.

The heavy opposition began to affect the Central Railroad of New Jersey's decision making. On January 26, a railroad official stated to the press that they would have to consider adjusting their decisions if the opposition continued to be fierce. The official stated that the committee that made the schedule in conjunction with the railroad felt that East 45th Street station was only 0.6 miles (0.97 km) from East 33rd Street and ridership would be willing to move. As part of the proposal, it would revise the timetable or work on the track speed between the East 33rd and East 45th Street stations. However, they asked in return for their flexibility to give the railroad six to eight weeks to make decisions. On January 28, proposed timetables that would go into effect on April 25 were released. Train service in the city of Bayonne would be dropped from 112 westbound and 120 eastbound to 75 westbound and 74 eastbound on weekdays. Aside of the closure of East 45th Street station, the new timetables noted that West 8th Street station would see 39 westbound and 41 eastbound stops (reduction from 47 in each direction); East 33rd Street (the closest to East 45th Street) would drop from 23 westbound and 26 eastbound to 23 and 22, respectively. Weekend service would also be curtailed in a similar fashion.

Entering February 1954, opposition from local groups in Bayonne continued to grow. The Veterans of World War I Bayonne Barracks 96 added their voice to the East 45th Street station abandonment controversy on February 2. The same day, the Bayonne Lions Club also voted unanimously to oppose the closure. Their resolution also added that the Club would send copies of their resolution to the hearing. Local residents in Hudson County joined together to form their own municipal ridership committee on February 2. The Mayor of Weehawken, Charles Krause, spearheaded the formation of the committee and contacted other Hudson County municipalities to press for their involvement. However, that same day, the city of Bayonne was notified that the Public Utilities Commission would hold a hearing on February 15.

Civic engagement on the subject continued when Commissioners George Prendeville and Thomas Domenico, along with Banner and Deputy Mayor Michael Lennon, would attend the hearing on behalf of the city. Brenner also urged local residents who could not leave their jobs to go to the hearing in Newark to send their significant others to the hearing in support of the city's positions. The municipality would also be offering free bus service to Newark for Bayonne residents interested in attending the hearing. These buses would leave Bayonne at 10 a.m. on February 15. Walter R. Calhoun Sr., who wrote the letter in January 1953 to Hortense Kessler, had been elected as new chair of the committee of residences and would be on the buses to Newark. The Junior Chamber of Commerce also joined the list of civic organizations opposed to the closure, passing their own resolution.

On the morning of February 15, over 50 citizens of Bayonne waited at the 45th Street station at 10 a.m. for the buses to depart for Newark. They jumped on the bus provided by Domenico with a sign marking them as the "45th Street Protest Group". Numerous local residents also used their automobiles to join for the trip to Newark. Galileo Crisonino, the chairman of the Bayonne Planning Board, todl the press that he was to speak at the hearing and also furnished maps of how much of the city actually benefits from East 45th Street station.

The hearing in Newark was contentious. Over 100 people from Bayonne attended the hearing, resulting in some being moved into interior corridors to help fill them all. Railroad officials blasted Bayonne officials for being uninterested in the pre-existing committee of municipalities that helped form the proposed April 25 timetables. They stated that the municipality could have gotten involved any time in the seven years that the committee existed but did not. Brenner, representing the city, denied this accusation. Brenner stated that the letters sent to officials in Hudson County never reached any municipality. August Drier, representing the committee, stated that he had communication from the Bayonne corporation counsel that they had interest. Brenner denied this, stating there was no corporation counsel in Bayonne.

Kessler opened the hearing by stating that she was impressed by the outpouring of support from residents of the municipality, noting this was not a common practice by others. The president of the Central Railroad of New Jersey, Earl T. Moore, stated under oath that the railroad could not provide "satisfactory" service for everyone along their lines and wanted to ensure that the greater good was the priority. A. E. Bjorkner, his assistant, testified that the greater public would be better served with the three stops closed and Lorraine seeing a service reduction. Brennan did state that new rail cars made by the Budd Company for better service would only stop in non-peak hours. Bjorkner added that only West 8th Street and East 33rd Street would see any express trains or new equipment.

After eight witnesses, Kessler adjourned the hearing until February 24 and February 25. As part of this, the testimony by Judson McLester Jr., the railroad's legal counsel, would involve the proposed timetables and the East 45th Street station status. However, Drier stated to the press after the hearing that he had communications with the city about this decision. Brennan challenged that argument, asking for proof of such communications.

However, before the hearing on February 24, Drier's committee and the railroad, stated to Kessler that they were going to make changes to the schedule over commuter complaints and that two meetings had been held since February 15. Brennan, upset at the lack of notification, called out the committee and railroad for still not adjusting to help East 45th Street station riders in favor of fewer riders west of Newark Bay. At the hearing, Brenner cross-examined Earl Moore, stating that the elimination of East 45th Street would result in a save of two minutes per train. Moore also added that passengers would have to pay an extra $4.90 per month to take buses to Greenville station to catch a train. Brenner asked Moore how many extra blocks this would involve walking. Moore stated that it would only result in two blocks. However, the walk to East 33rd Street station would be more and cost $4 per month. Moore added that the railroad spent $50,000 to modernize West 8th Street station and another $500,000 for bridges between West 8th Street and East 22nd Street. Moore also admitted that they planned to eliminate the agent at East 22nd Street station. Brenner cross-examined Bjorkner, who also was a former agent at East 45th Street station, stating that Bayonne provided about 8,488 riders, but 938 of them were non-revenue riders. The meeting adjourned until February 25.

At the February 25 hearing, local commuters and industry executives testified in defense of the city. Six commuters and several executives stated that the closure of East 45th Street station would cause undue hardship and that in order to make up for the loss of the station, 16 extra buses would need to be provided on Broadway for access to East 33rd Street station. John Saylor, the Deputy Attorney General, got the railroad to admit no one had been notified about the 28 last minute adjustments made to the April 25 timetables and that Bayonne was not invited. Kessler asked if the amendments made during the hearing process were legal because of the lack of notice provided. Kessler stated that they would check the law due to lack of precedent of such a situation.

Calhoun testified that the Central Railroad were presenting false figures for how much it costs for their improvement program to deceive riders. The railroad stated that the line had eight stations in the first 7 miles (11 km), but Calhoun noted that other railroads did such a thing. Calhoun felt that the railroad was using a suburban mindset for the urban rapid transit commuter. Walter I. Gross, manager of the American Radiator and Standard Sanity Corporation, testified that of the 640 employees at the company, 170 were New York residents while 11 used the East 45th Street station to go the New Jersey suburbs. Gross stated that the majority of the workers had a nine hour work day with five hours of commuting. He felt that the elimination of East 45th Street station would resulting in losing several workers from his company. With the lack of local foundry workers in Bayonne and a $70 per week salary, he would find it tough for anyone to deal with more than 14 hours a day for work. The hearings were adjourned until March 3 and March 4, 1954, if deemed necessary.

The final hearing came on March 4, 1954. At the hearing, N.N. Bailey, the general manager of the railroad, noted that the two minutes saved were his only reasons for shuttering East 45th Street station. Bailey stated that the selection of East 45th Street station was arbitrary and would have preferred that three stops in Bayonne be eliminated in favor of a single stop in Bayonne. Kessler, asking Bailey, noted that the railroad did not present any financial proof that the East 45th Street station closure would benefit the railroad, just the extra two minutes saved. Brenner retorted to Bailey that the railroad operated four stations in the city of Elizabeth, which also had service from the Pennsylvania Railroad. Bailey stated that Spring Street station had small ridership itself. Bailey added that no one at East 45th Street station or on trains that stopped there had been surveyed about any potential station closure.

Prendeville testified that the area from 40th Street to 58th Street, had around 20,000 people in population. Robert Frederickson, the chief research accountant for the railroad stated that the railroad would only save $7,200 for eliminating East 45th Street station. However, the station revenue in 1953 was $40,839 from East 45th Street, mostly from ridership, but included $850 from the Union News Company stand at the stop. In total the expenses of operating the station in 1953 were $8,058. However, the savings would be even less, as the railroad would still be paying maintenance and local property taxes. The hearing concluded at 3:25 p.m. and Kessler stated that the decision would be made before the April 25 schedules go into effect.

The Public Utility Commissioners announced their decision on March 26, 1954. As part of the agreement, East 45th Street station would remain open, but its daily schedule would be cut from 41 trains to 16. Seven trains would stop at East 45th Street eastbound and nine westbound. On Saturdays, the station would have four eastbound and three westbound trains. Sundays would have four trains in each direction. Under this decision, East 45th Street station would be reduced to a rush hour stop, garnering a positive response from Brenner. The station agent at East 45th Street station (along with the one at East 22nd Street) would be eliminated as well. Clark thanked everyone who attended the hearings for their support.

The majority of the changes to operate the new service were in place by the operation of the new service on April 25. Several locomotives were not on the property. Signal work and platform length increases were in place between Jersey City and Hampton.

==== Closure ====
After multiple complaints were made about the lack of heat in the East 45th Street station depot, including by Calhoun, an automatic oil heating unit shipped on December 14, 1954, to be installed in the station.

On October 10, 1957, the railroad announced there would be a hearing on October 21 in Newark for the proposal to demolish the East 45th Street station depot. The construction of Route 169 in Bayonne would require the construction of a new bridge on Center Street that spanned the railroad and highway. The new bridge would be built next to the current one. In replacement of the station, the railroad would build a three-sided wooden station shelter. At the hearing, the railroad also requested the demolition of the Van Nostrand Place station. Central Railroad of New Jersey officials also noted that the East 45th Street station was in the right-of-way of Route 169, along with the bridge, and that the station was only being used by 250 people daily.

The Public Utilities Commission granted approval for the new station sheds at East 45th Street and Van Nostrand Place on December 28. The railroad stated that the demolitions would be part of the plan to reduce an operating deficit in passenger service of $3.4 million (equivalent to $39.0 million in 2025). The wooden shed at East 45th Street station would be 10 by 25 feet (3.0 m × 7.6 m) while the one at Van Nostrand Place would be 6 by 10 feet (1.8 m × 3.0 m). The plans noted the new 45th Street station would be built under the new bridge.

Survey work for the new Center Street Bridge began in April 1959. By August, construction had begun, with footings for the new bridge built next to the shelter on the westbound side of the tracks at 45th Street station. That month, the city also agreed to pay the railroad $5,000 for the $15,000 construction contract of the bridge. However, Bayonne upped it to $15,000 by December. The municipality would get $10,000 back from the Central Railroad and Lehigh Valley Railroad. The city approved $10,000 on December 23 to bring the total commitment to $25,000. By April 1960, the steel for the new bridge arrived. By July 25, 1960, the new bridge had its steel installed, and a new three-sided station shelter had been built under the bridge. The bridge opened on July 28, 1960, replacing the old wooden structure.

The 20-by-50-foot (6.1 m × 15.2 m) large, wooden station depot was razed in 1961. Passenger service to East 45th Street ended on April 30, 1967, when the Aldene Plan went into effect, moving Central Railroad commuter services through Newark Penn Station via the Lehigh Valley Railroad. Service through Bayonne was truncated from Communipaw Terminal to East 33rd Street.

=== HBLR station ===
In 1995, New Jersey Transit and the New Jersey Department of Transportation announced construction of a new light rail line in Hudson and Bergen Counties. As part of construction, the line would use a to-be abandoned Conrail right-of-way that was the former Central Railroad alignment. 33 stations would be operated on the line, including five in Bayonne: West Fifth Street, West 8th Street, East 22nd Street, East 34th Street and East 45th Street. The new stop in the northern end of Bayonne would be located at the 45th Street and Centre Street junction, like its predecessor. Pedestrian access to the station would be available on 45th Street and on Avenue E. East 45th Street station would have a parking lot with 260 spaces on the property of the Military Ocean Terminal (MOTBY). In the Environmental Impact Statement, notes were made that the United States Government was willing to make the MOTBY land for a new parking lot. It would use Centre Street bridge's pedestrian path for access. Three staircases already existed from the Centre Street bridge, but could not be used due to going east of the tracks. The third would have value, coming from the junction of Centre Street and Avenue E.

In June 1996, New Jersey Transit announced the opening of artist proposals for the new stations at 34th Street and 45th Street. Artists would have to help design projects for the windscreens and weather vanes on station canopies. 45th Street station would require $18,000–$40,000 for production and installation of the art, which would reflect the community around the station. 45th Street would also have an entrance portal and arbor with a waiting area for the station entry. The station would also have a 30-foot (9.1 m) tall neon sign with 14-foot (4.3 m) beacons.

Construction of 45th Street station was under way by July 1998, when Governor Christine Todd Whitman joined officials from the state and Bayonne to speak about the project. The officials spoke on a partially-built platform at the station near Avenue E, including Whitman talking about the gasoline tax proposal she had introduced. Nick Capodice, a city councilman, praised the project for the economic benefits it would bring Bayonne. By November 1998, the station platforms' foundations were complete at the 45th Street and 34th Street stations and new rail ties had been placed between 45th and 34th. The new parking lot for 45th Street was also getting trees and ground cover to help improve the design. At that point, plans were set to test the trains in 90 days. Joseph Doria, the mayor of Bayonne, toured the progress that same month, riding in trucks built for tracks from 45th Street to Liberty State Park station, followed by a regular truck down to Essex Street station in Jersey City. Construction of the new station's parking lot was complete with the landscaping.

The overhead catenary lines providing electric power were turned on January 14, 1999 along a 2.5-mile (4.0 km) section of tracks from 45th Street station to Wilson Street in Jersey City. The first test train ran over this segment on March 22, with several federal, state and local officials on board. By May 1999, the art at 45th Street station had been installed. The windscreens at the station were designed by Franc Palaia of Jersey City. The see-through windscreens contained etched glass so riders could see through in terms of safety. At 45th Street station, Palaia etched the Newark Bay Bridge, St. Vincent's Church, a library, and the gazebo at Stephen Gregg/Bayonne County Park.

All power came on in December 1999 and test trains began operating. However, before the 45th Street and Jersey Avenue stations opened, vandals struck the new stops in March 2000. With operations beginning on April 15, 45th Street station and West Side Avenue station in Jersey City would have food vendors and entertainment greeting new riders on the trains. Governor Whitman was aboard the first train at 10 a.m. from Liberty State Park station.

However, before service began, the Bayonne City Council suspended the elimination of on-street parking near 34th and 45th Street stations because of concerns about lack of parking. With the new stations, yellow-painted curbs were designed to follow state guidelines of no parking 30 feet (9.1 m) from corners. Vincent Lo Re Jr., the Council President asked the city's Department of Public Works to halt the painting in the area until they could adjust to help residents. While no bus would stop at 45th Street, a stop for New Jersey Transit's Route 381 bus, would be at 34th Street station.

Service began on April 15, 2000. Due to rain, the turnout for the new light rail was lower than expected, with 7,500 people riding the new train. Governor Whitman addressed the crowd, projecting that within ten years it would have 50,000 riders daily. Doria stated that property values in the city of Bayonne rose by 20% in 1998 and 1999 due to the construction of the light rail.

== Station layout ==
There are two tracks and a single island platform with shelter. Two separate services serve the 45th Street station, the local from 8th Street and Hoboken Terminal and the express known as the Bayonne Flyer. The station is fully accessible for people with disabilities, including full elevator service.

== Bibliography ==
- Bernhart, Benjamin L. (2004). Historic Journeys By Rail: Central Railroad of New Jersey Stations, Structures & Marine Equipment. Outer Station Project. ISBN 1-891402-07-2.
- Federal Transit Administration (1995). Turnkey Demonstration Program. Federal Transit Administration.
- Hussey, Elisha Charles (1876). Home Building. New York, New York: Leader & Van Hoesen.
- Middleton, Kathleen M. (1995). Images of America: Bayonne. Mount Pleasant, South Carolina: Arcadia Publishing. ISBN 978-0-7385-5725-0.
- New Jersey Board of Public Utilities (1917). Annual Report of the Board of Public Utility Commissioners for the State of New Jersey for the Year 1916. Trenton, New Jersey: MacCrellish & Quigley Co.
- New Jersey State Board of Taxes and Assessment (1916). First Annual Report of the State Board of Taxes and Assessment of the State of New Jersey For the Year 1915. Somerville, New Jersey: The Unionist-Gazette Association.
- New Jersey State Board of Taxes and Assessment (1924). Eighth Annual Report of the New Jersey State Board of Taxes and Assessment for the Year Ending June 30, 1923. Trenton, New Jersey: MacCrellish & Quigley.
- New Jersey Transit (1995). Bayonne Extension Supplemental Draft Environmental Impact Statement. Newark, New Jersey: New Jersey Transit.
