= Richard Street station =

Light rail station in Jersey City, New Jersey, United States

Richard Street
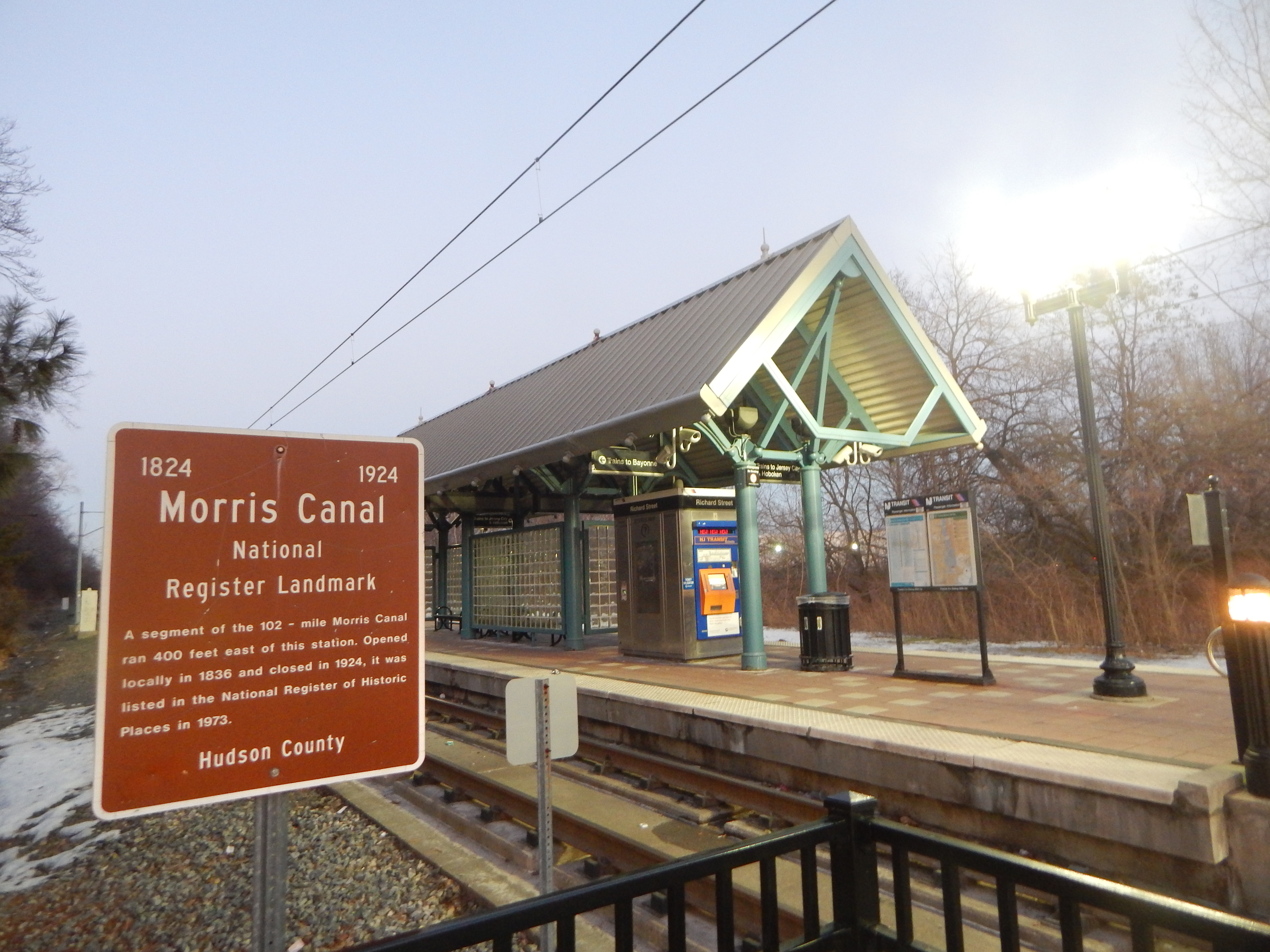
- The signage for the former Morris Canal with the station for Richard Street in March 2015.

General information
- Location: Richard Street & Garfield Avenue; Jersey City, New Jersey
- Coordinates: 40°41′57″N 74°04′43″W
- Owner: New Jersey Transit
- Platforms: 1 island platform
- Tracks: 2

Construction
- Structure type: At-grade
- Cycle facilities: Yes
- Accessible: Yes

Other information
- Fare zone: 1

History
- Opened: April 15, 2000

Passengers
- 2025: 1,602 (average weekday)
- Rank: 13 of 24

Services
Preceding station	NJ Transit	Following station
Danforth Avenue toward 8th Street	Bayonne–Hoboken	Liberty State Park toward Hoboken
Bayonne Flyer does not stop here
Location

Richard Street station is a station on the Hudson–Bergen Light Rail (HBLR) located in the Greenville section of Jersey City, New Jersey. Located at the end of Richard Street next to the northeast end of Bayside Park, the station services local trains of the Hudson–Bergen Light Rail between 8th Street station in Bayonne and Hoboken Terminal. The station contains a single island platform and two tracks. The station is accessible for handicapped persons as part of the Americans with Disabilities Act of 1990, with ramps and platform level matching with trains. The station opened on April 15, 2000 as part of the original operating segment of the Hudson–Bergen Light Rail.

Richard Street station was built north of the site of a former Central Railroad of New Jersey station in the same area. Located at what is now the south end of Bayside Park, Van Nostrand Place station was a stop on the Main Line in Jersey City. Opened in 1891, later than most stations on the line, Van Nostrand Place had a smaller station compared to others, only at 15 by 27 feet (4.6 m × 8.2 m), and only a single story. The railroad discontinued agency services in January 1953 and in June 1958, they razed the single story depot, replacing it with two shelters (one in each direction). Passenger service to Van Nostrand Place ended on April 30, 1967, when the Aldene Plan went into effect, moving CNJ commuter services through Newark Penn Station via the Lehigh Valley Railroad. Service through Bayonne and Jersey City was truncated from Communipaw Terminal to East 33rd Street.

== History ==
=== Jersey Central station ===
In August 1890, local citizens urged the Central Railroad of New Jersey to construct a station at Van Nostrand Place. Bayonne's former mayor David W. Oliver and Joseph Van Nostrand, a local land owner, donated land for a new station. This new land would be used to construct the grading for the new stop. The railroad promised local citizens and officials that when they completed a new bridge over four tracks and a local canal. However, construction of the new bridge completed and no station came with it. Local citizens, upset with this, reminded the railroad that the new depot at Van Nostrand Place would benefit the railroad and the city. Locals were already advertising for lots around the area of the future station, including 50 lots on Ocean Avenue, ensuring that the new residences would be in range of the new stop, along with the Jackson Avenue station on the Newark and New York Branch.

The Bayonne Citizens' Association sent a letter in the fall of 1890 advocating for the construction of a station at Van Nostrand Place. J.H. Oberhauser, the General Superintendent, stated to the locals that plans were in place to build the station, but no timeline existed for when construction would begin.

Central Railroad engineers arrived in April 1891 to begin construction of a new station at Van Nostrand Place. The process began with surveying the land for the new stop. Progress on the new station went quickly. By June, the piledrivers had finished setting up the ground for the new station foundation. Edwards Brothers, a local subcontractor for the brickwork, would install the foundation for carpenters to begin building the depot. They started their work on June 22, with the expectation that they would by the end of the week. Oberhauser also inspected the construction. At the time, he speculated that the station would be finished by July 15, 1891. The foundation was in place by July 22. At that point, the Jersey City Building Inspector, issued permits for the construction of the depot and one at Communipaw. Both depots would be Queen Anne style architecture wooden frame structures with slate roofs. Edwards Brothers also had the contract at Communipaw. The wooden frame came up on July 25. At that point, the belief was the station would be complete by the end of August. The Van Nostrand family would also cut Van Nostrand Avenue through on their own to improve access to the new station, along with other general improvements.

By the end of September, construction of the new depot at Communipaw finished. Progress also continued rapidly on the new depot at Van Nostrand Place. The painters finished the station in October and the set completion date moved to November 1. Construction of the Van Nostrand Place station finished in November 1891 and the railroad announced that the station would open on November 16, eliminating a 1 mile (1.6 km) long walk to other stations for those in the neighborhood. However, the station opened on November 18, 1891 instead.

The Central Railroad rebuilt the station in 1929. Instead of using subcontractors, the railroad did the construction work instead. As part of construction, the railroad installed two 700-foot (210 m) long concrete platforms at the station. They also installed an overhead bridge to connect the westbound and eastbound platforms, installing a track fence as well to prevent people from crossing the right-of-way to the other platform. The Van Nostrand Place depot moved 1,000 feet (300 m) down the tracks from its old location. The railroad opened the rebuilt station on September 16, 1929 and announced that on September 29, they would raise the amount of trains stopping at Van Nostrand Place.

The railroad eliminated the station agent at Van Nostrand Place in January 1953, moving Winifred Doody to the East 33rd Street station after 17 years at Van Nostrand Place.

Van Nostrand Place Jersey City

General information
- Location: Van Nostrand Avenue east of Garfield Avenue, Jersey City, New Jersey
- Line: Central Railroad of New Jersey Main Line
- Platforms: 2 side platforms
- Tracks: 2

History
- Opened: November 18, 1891
- Closed: April 30, 1967
- Rebuilt: –September 16, 1929

Key dates
- January 1953: Station agent eliminated

Former services
Preceding station	Central Railroad of New Jersey	Following station
Greenville toward Elizabethport	Suburban service to Elizabethport	Communipaw Avenue toward Jersey City
Location

The Central Railroad announced on October 10, 1957 that there would be a hearing in Newark with the Public Utilities Commission to demolish the Van Nostrand Place depot along with the one at East 45th Street in Bayonne. Due to construction of Route 169, the right-of-way would result in the demolition of the structures. At that point, the railroad would construct new three-sided wooden shelters for the 100 passengers who were still using Van Nostrand Place station. The hearing would be held on October 21. The Public Utilities Commission granted the railroad permission to raze both stations on December 28, 1957. The new station shelter at Van Nostrand Place would be an open-air 6 by 10 feet (1.8 m × 3.0 m) wooden shelter. The railroad added that the demolition was part of a project to reduce an operating deficit of $3.4 million (equivalent to $39.0 million in 2025) in passenger service. Construction of the new shelters began at the end of January 1958. The railroad installed the new shelter by June 1958 and razed the station that month.

Passenger service at Van Nostrand Place station ended on April 30, 1967 with the adoption of the Aldene Plan, moving Central Railroad services east of Cranford to Newark Penn Station. Service in Bayonne and Jersey City became a shuttle from Cranford to the East 33rd Street in Bayonne. As a result, East 45th Street station and all the Jersey City stops were discontinued.

=== HBLR station ===
The New Jersey Department of Transportation and New Jersey Transit announced construction of a new light rail line 1995. This light rail line would use some former Central Railroad right-of-way planned to be abandoned by Conrail. Of 33 stations proposed by New Jersey Transit, 14 were proposed in Jersey City. This included a station at Richard Street, four blocks north of Van Nostrand Avenue, at end of Bayside Park. Richard Street station would have 1,450 parking spaces, using property of the Newark Bay Extension of the New Jersey Turnpike's former Peter Stuyvesant Service Area, along with nearby unused industrial property.

Construction of the Richard Street station began in October 1997, with rails on the property. At that time they announced the platform at Richard Street would be the first station to be built of the Hudson-Bergen Light Rail, with construction starting in October.

In November 1998, Joseph Doria, the mayor of Bayonne, rode with local officials on specially designed trucks through Richard Street station on its way to Liberty State Park station. Officials turned on the electric overhead catenary lines on January 14, 1999 and the first test train operated on March 22. The entire operating segment turned on in December 1999.

In advance of the opening of the station on April 15, 2000, officials announced that Richard Street station would have musical entertainment, various vendors, a local bake sale and guest appearances by players of the New York/New Jersey MetroStars, a Harrison-based Major League Soccer affiliate.

Governor Christine Todd Whitman was on the first operating train at 10 a.m. on April 15, 2000. She followed by addressing the crowd of riders in attendance of the opening. Due to poor weather, turnout at the opening missed expectations, with 7,500 people riding the light rail. It is located along the former Central Railroad of New Jersey right of way, which terminated at Communipaw Terminal. During excavations for its construction, workers came across what appear to be the petrified remains of luggage, which were also found at nearby Danforth Avenue stop.

On August 1, 2010, gunfire erupted at the station, sending a group of people running for cover as they were chased by a gunman on the platform. Police arrived at 10:32pm (EST). The gunman and the group were gone, but police recovered three spent bullet casings at the scene, and one bullet projectile at the base of the steps leading to the platform. One of the railings of the steps was struck by one of the bullets. A witness who had been walking about 50 feet behind the group on the platform stated he saw another man run past him and fire three or four shots into the group. No one was shot or injured. The gunman, was described as being in his late teens, 5-foot-8, wearing blue jeans and a black T-shirt.

== Bibliography ==
- Bernhart, Benjamin L. (2004). Historic Journeys By Rail: Central Railroad of New Jersey Stations, Structures & Marine Equipment. Outer Station Project. ISBN 1-891402-07-2.
- Federal Transit Administration (1995). Turnkey Demonstration Program. Federal Transit Administration.
- New Jersey State Board of Taxes and Assessment (1918). Third Annual Report of the New Jersey State Board of Taxes and Assessment. Somerville, New Jersey: The Unionist-Gazette Association State Printers.
- New Jersey Transit (1995). Bayonne Extension Supplemental Draft Environmental Impact Statement. Newark, New Jersey: New Jersey Transit.
