= Liberty State Park station =

Light rail station in Jersey City, New Jersey, United States

Liberty State Park
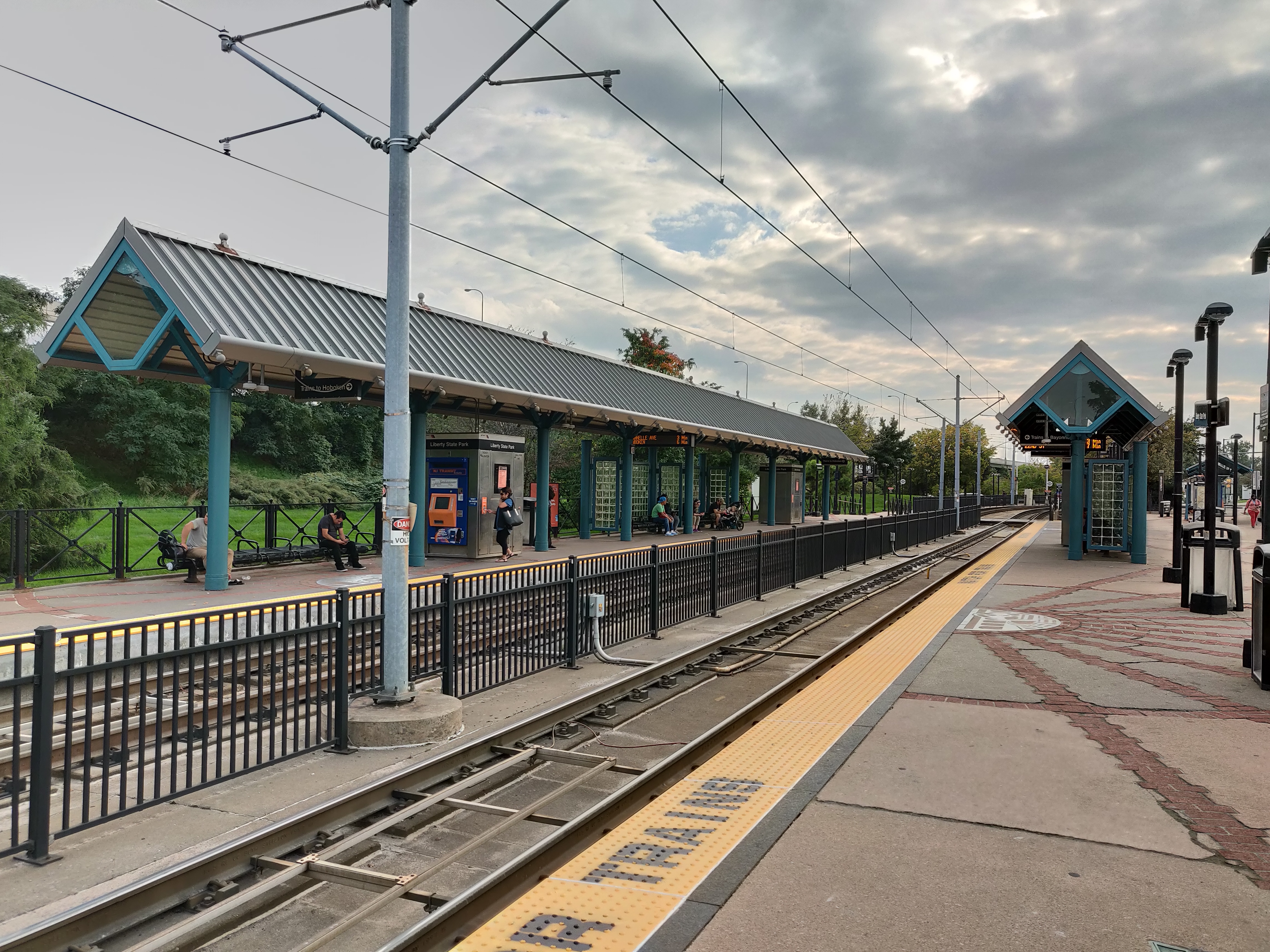
- Liberty State Park station platforms

General information
- Location: Communipaw Avenue & Johnston Avenue; Jersey City, New Jersey
- Coordinates: 40°42′33″N 74°03′28″W
- Owner: New Jersey Transit
- Platforms: 2 side platforms
- Tracks: 2
- Connections: NJ Transit Bus: 16; EZ Ride: LSP Shuttle (Seasonal)

Construction
- Parking: 1,248 spaces, 22 accessible spaces
- Cycle facilities: Yes
- Accessible: Yes

Other information
- Fare zone: 1

History
- Opened: April 15, 2000

Passengers
- 2025: 3,395 (average weekday)
- Rank: 4 of 24

Services
Preceding station	NJ Transit	Following station
Garfield Avenue toward West Side Avenue	West Side–Tonnelle	Jersey Avenue toward Tonnelle Avenue
Richard Street toward 8th Street	Bayonne–Hoboken	Jersey Avenue toward Hoboken
45th Street toward 8th Street	Bayonne Flyer	Essex Street toward Hoboken
Location

Liberty State Park station is a station on the Hudson–Bergen Light Rail (HBLR) located between Communipaw and Johnston Avenues in Jersey City, New Jersey. The station opened on April 15, 2000. There are two tracks and two side platforms.

Northbound service from the station is available to Hoboken Terminal and Tonnelle Avenue in North Bergen. Southbound service is available to terminals at West Side Avenue in Jersey City or 8th Street in Bayonne. 1248 park and ride spaces are also available one block from the station at the Liberty Science Center. A HBLR yard is located west of the line, south of this station. South of here, the line is in a railroad easement, and speeds are higher than in the parts where it is a streetcar line.

New Jersey Transit had been considering a spur from the station to the old Central Railroad of New Jersey Communipaw Terminal within Liberty State Park since 2010 but ended consideration after Hurricane Sandy citing the vulnerability of any rail infrastructure in the park to future storm surges.

Starting in 2024, a free shuttle service by EZ Ride began operating on weekends and holidays from April to November connecting various points of interest within the park to the station and ferry service at Liberty Landing.
