= 22nd Street station (Hudson–Bergen Light Rail) =

Station on the Hudson–Bergen Light Rail in Bayonne, New Jersey

22nd Street Station
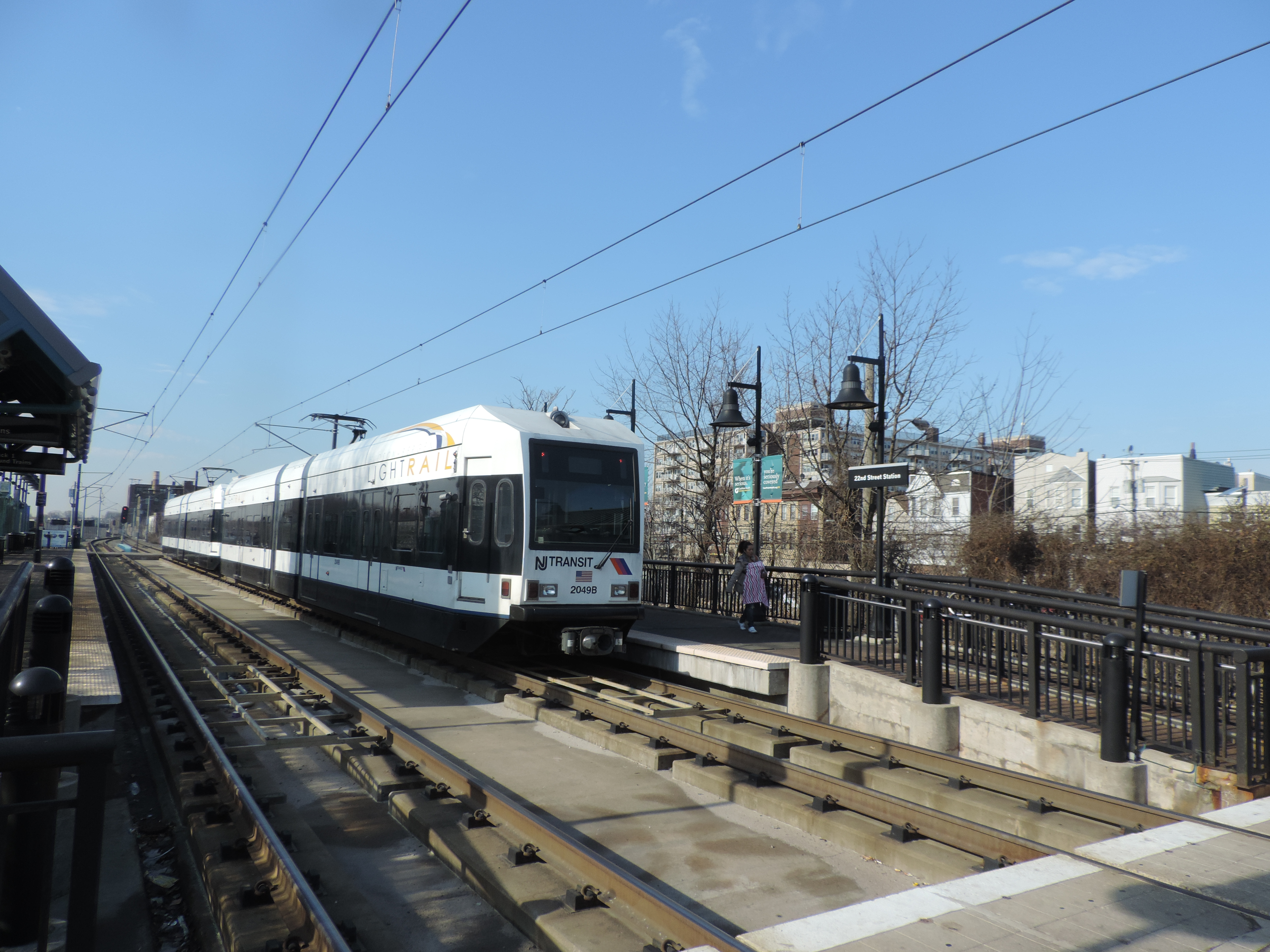
- 22nd Street station platforms in March 2016.

General information
- Location: Avenue E at East 22nd Street; Bayonne, New Jersey
- Coordinates: 40°39′40″N 74°06′58″W
- Owner: New Jersey Transit
- Platforms: 2 side platforms
- Tracks: 2
- Connections: NJ Transit Bus: 12

Construction
- Structure type: Elevated
- Parking: 159 spaces, 6 accessible spaces
- Cycle facilities: Yes
- Accessible: Yes

Other information
- Fare zone: 1

History
- Opened: November 15, 2003

Passengers
- 2025: 2,200 (average weekday)
- Rank: 8 of 24

Services
Preceding station	NJ Transit	Following station
8th Street Terminus	Bayonne–Hoboken	34th Street toward Hoboken
8th Street Terminus	Bayonne Flyer	34th Street toward Hoboken
Former services
Preceding station	Conrail	Following station
West 8th Street toward Cranford	Cranford–Bayonne Shuttle	East 33rd Street Terminus
Preceding station	Central Railroad of New Jersey	Following station
West 8th Street toward Somerville	Somerville – Jersey City Local East 22nd Street	East 33rd Street toward Jersey City
West 8th Street toward Elizabethport	Suburban service to Elizabethport	East 33rd Street toward Jersey City
Location

22nd Street station is a station on the Hudson–Bergen Light Rail (HBLR) in Bayonne, Hudson County, New Jersey. Located between East 22nd and East 21st Streets in Bayonne, the station is the second of four stops in the city. The station contains two tracks with a set of two side platforms, an outlier from the other stations of Bayonne, which all contain island platforms. 22nd Street serves two different services, the local line between 8th Street in Bayonne and Hoboken Terminal. It also serves the Bayonne Flyer, an express between the four Bayonne stops and Hoboken. The station is handicap accessible with elevators and platform levels that meet the Americans with Disabilities Act of 1990 standards. 22nd Street opened on November 15, 2003 as an extension from 34th Street, serving as the terminal until 8th Street opened on January 31, 2011.

== History ==
22nd Street is built next to the site of a station for the Central Railroad of New Jersey that once existed on the location. Known originally as Centerville (later East 22nd Street), the stop served the main line as one of five stops in Bayonne. Service at Centerville began on August 1, 1864 as part of a steam extension between the future Communipaw Terminal and Bergen Point. This service existed prior to the construction of the bridge across Newark Bay from Elizabethport to Bergen Point. A station was built on the eastbound side of the tracks in 1878 at the size of 17 by 37 feet (5.2 m × 11.3 m), two stories high. A station was also built on the westbound side in 1904. These depots were demolished on June 7, 1957, with the eastbound station being converted into a shelter. That in return was torn down in 1970 and replaced with a three-sided metal shed. Passenger service at East 22nd Street ended on August 6, 1978 when Conrail ended the shuttle between Cranford and East 33rd Street.

== Station layout and services ==
The station was the terminus of the HBLR between its opening as a single station extension on November 15, 2003 to the opening of 8th Street, the next station south, on January 31, 2011. The station has two side platforms on two tracks, and while serving as a terminal trains departed from either track and reversed at a crossover north of the station. To the south, the two tracks continue for a bit before merging into one that ended at a bumper block before 8th Street opened. This meant trains could have also reversed directions south of the station, but this was not normally done and the tail track was simply used for short-term storage. Some rush hour trains terminate at this station because of the operational constraints posed by the single track.

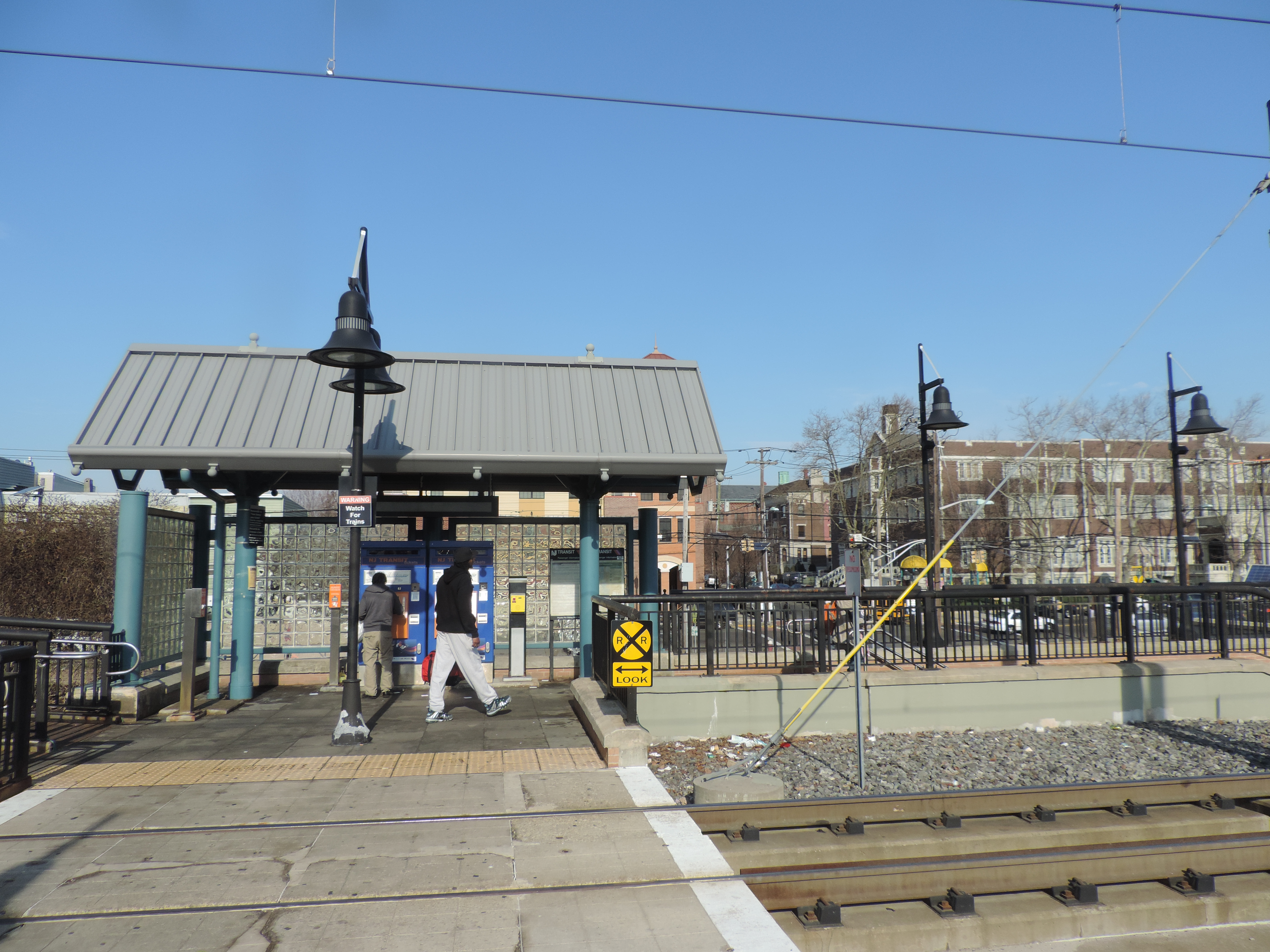
The southbound shelter at 22nd Street station

The station is located on a private right-of-way in a shopping area. Local streets pass underneath via 11-foot (3.4 m) clearance tunnels. A freight track is to the east of the station, running along the northbound platform on the right-of-way. The platforms have the traditional HBLR canopies. The northbound track has a full length wall of semi-opaque glass bricks, forming a windscreen between it and the freight track. Etched in these bricks are silhouettes of Bayonne's industrial architecture by Kate Dodd. The track glass walls have an artwork called Doors and Windows of Bayonne by Lisa Kaslow. These consist of actual fiberglass, copper and patina doors models of doors and windows from architectural details of Bayonne. The southbound platform has its own colorful glass windscreens, although portions of this platform on an embankment have a simple, low fence. The artwork is called Bayonne Time & Tides by J. Kenneth Leap and shows the history of Bayonne through photographs and maps. The glass windscreens in the shelters have etchings by Kate Dodd of Bayonne's industrial past.

Only the southbound platform has access to the streets. At the north end, a staircase leads down to the south side of 22nd Street between Avenue E and Prospect Avenue. The south end entrance contains an elevator for ADA access with a brick enclosure and a staircase down to the north side of 21st Street. Each entrance area has a small canopy with ticket vending machines and validators (making the platforms a fare paid zone). Pedestrian crossings at either end provide access to and from the northbound platform.

22nd Street station has two parking lots operated by 21st Century Rail. The main lot, a 159-space park and ride, is located on East 19th Street between Avenue F and Prospect Avenue. The station has no accessible spaces for handicapped riders. The second lot, located at the junction of East 21st Street and Prospect Avenue, contains six accessible spots closer to the station.

== Bibliography ==
- Papers Read Before the Historical Society of Hudson County. Jersey City, New Jersey: Historical Society of Hudson County. 1908.
- Bernhart, Benjamin L. (2004). Historical Journeys By Rail: Central Railroad of New Jersey Stations, Structures & Marine Equipment. Outer Station Project. ISBN 1-891402-07-2.
