= 1958 Newark Bay rail accident =

Fatal train wreck in New Jersey, U.S.

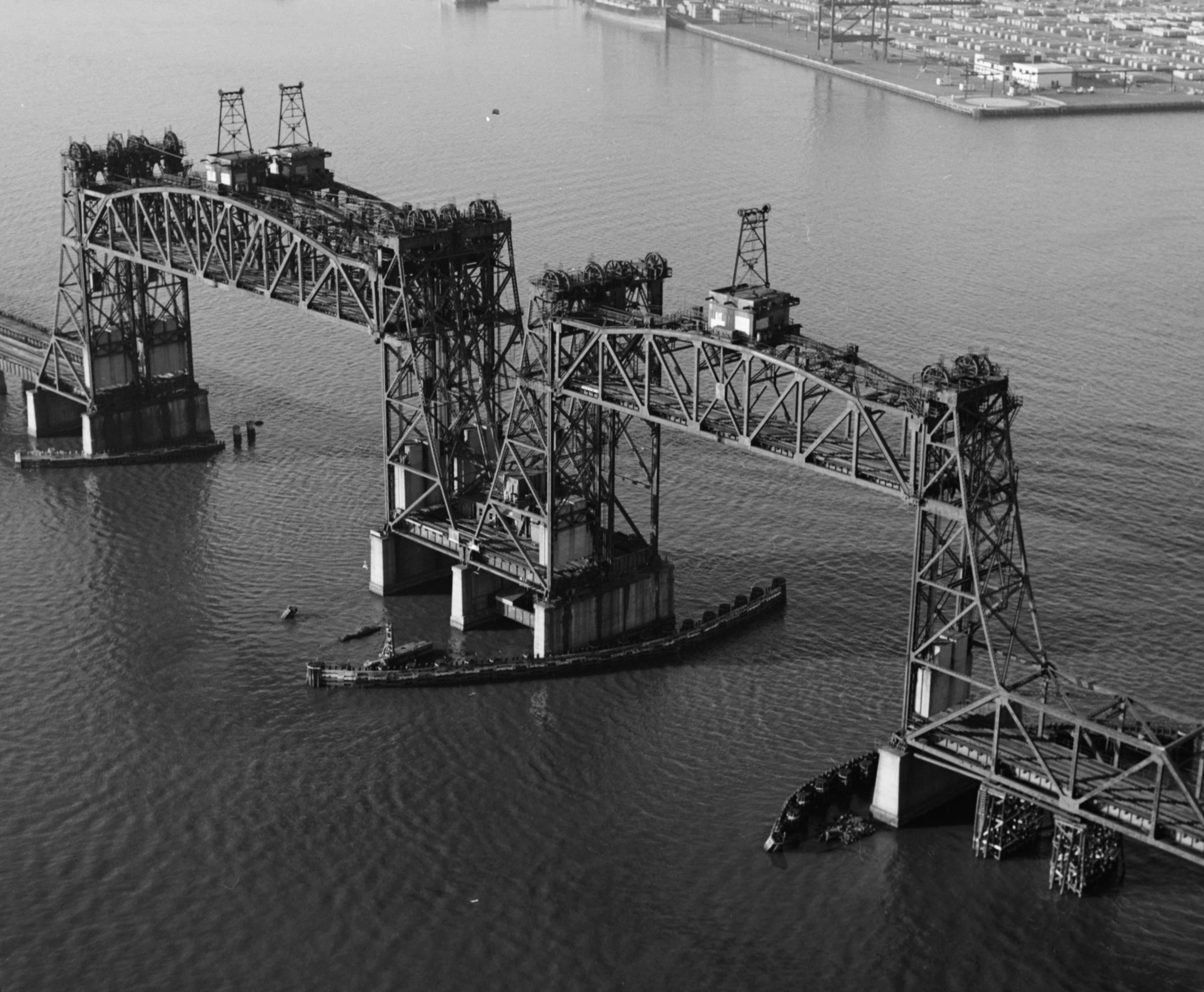
- The Newark Bay Bridge with its lifts raised, as they were when the train derailed

- The Newark Bay Bridge was located on the line shown in gray and labeled CNJ between Elizabeth and Bayonne.

Details
- Date: September 15, 1958; 68 years ago 10:01 am EDT
- Location: Newark Bay, Bayonne, New Jersey, U.S.
- Coordinates: 40.6545°N 74.15°W
- Country: United States
- Line: Central Railroad of New Jersey main line
- Operator: Central Railroad of New Jersey
- Incident type: Derailment into water
- Cause: Signal passed at danger

Statistics
- Trains: 1
- Deaths: 48
- Injured: 48

On September 15, 1958, a Central Railroad of New Jersey (CNJ) morning commuter train, #3314, ran through a restricting and a stop signal, derailed, and slid off the open Newark Bay lift bridge in Newark Bay, New Jersey, United States. Both diesel locomotives and the first two coaches plunged into Newark Bay and sank immediately, killing 48 people and injuring 48 more. A third coach, snagged by its rear truck (bogie), hung precariously off the bridge for two hours before it also toppled into the water. As the locomotive crew was killed, the cause of the crash was never proven, though the lack of a "dead man's switch" may have contributed to the derailment.

== Conditions ==
There were three signals spaced at 3/4 mile (1,200 m), 1/4 mile (400 m), and 500 feet (150 m) from the lift bridge, and an automatic derailing device 50 feet (15 m) beyond the third signal. The bridge span had to be down and locked electrically before the signals and derail devices could be cleared for movement on the track. Conversely, all the devices had to be in their most restrictive positions before the bridge could be unlocked and raised. The train ran through two signals and immediately derailed; the automatic derailer was designed to knock the wheels off the track so that the resistance of the ties and ballast against the train's wheels would bring a slow-moving derailed train to a stop. Train No. 3314, although derailed, was moving at such a great speed that it did not have sufficient distance to stop before diving off the bridge.

== Causes ==
The Interstate Commerce Commission (ICC), the New Jersey Public Utilities Commission, and the United States Army Corps of Engineers each conducted separate inquiries into the wreck, and all three found that the absence of a "dead man's switch" was one primary cause of the crash. After the inquiries, the New Jersey Public Utilities Commission ordered the railroads to install such devices on all passenger locomotives operating in New Jersey. Some CNJ locomotives were equipped already with such devices, but this did not include the engine leading Train #3314 (a EMD GP7 No. 1532) on the day of the wreck. The CNJ claimed that such a device was not always necessary, because all their trains had two crewmen in the locomotive cab. If the engineer was incapacitated somehow, the fireman would assume control of the locomotive.

An autopsy found that the engineer, 63-year-old Lloyd Wilburn, had indications of hypertensive heart disease, but that he had died of asphyxia due to drowning. However, no reason could be found to explain why fireman Peter Andrew, 42, could not or did not stop the train. Investigators raised the wreckage and did not find any defect of the braking system on the locomotives and coaches; it was also determined that the signal system and derailing device on the bridge had functioned properly. Lacking more definitive evidence, it was presumed that the engineer had somehow become incapacitated in the cab and the fireman failed to take appropriate action to stop the train. The presence of a dead man's control in the locomotive cab might have averted the catastrophe, and, while the ICC only "recommended" the installation of these devices, the New Jersey Board of Public Utilities directed that the railroad install them in all of its locomotives.

== Aftermath ==
At least 48 people died in the wreck, including former New York Yankees second baseman George "Snuffy" Stirnweiss and the father of writer Steve Adams. The CNJ faced a number of legal actions which were all settled out of court. The two locomotives, #1532 and #1526, both being EMD GP7s, were raised, rebuilt by the Electro-Motive Division of General Motors (EMD) and returned to service. Locomotive #1532 retained its original number, while the #1526 was renumbered #1531. They served primarily as freight locomotives, although #1532 was photographed in passenger service after its return from EMD. The Newark Bay lift bridge was used until the last passenger train left Bayonne's Eighth Street Station on August 6, 1978. Demolition of the central lift spans began in July 1980 after the United States Coast Guard declared the structure a navigational hazard to ships. The trestle and approaches were removed in 1987–1988 when it became apparent that a replacement span was no longer feasible. Removal of the piers began in 2012.

== In literature ==
- In Slapstick, a novel by Kurt Vonnegut, the wreck is referenced in the novel as the cause of death of his brother-in-law James C. Adams two days before his sister's death from cancer, leaving the couple's four sons suddenly orphaned. Vonnegut adopted all four.
- In Night Without End, a novel by Alistair Maclean, the wreck is referenced in the novel on a scrap of a newspaper clipping found in the wallet of one of the passengers on the crashed plane.
