= 34th Street station (Hudson–Bergen Light Rail) =

New Jersey Transit Hudson–Bergen Light Rail station

34th Street
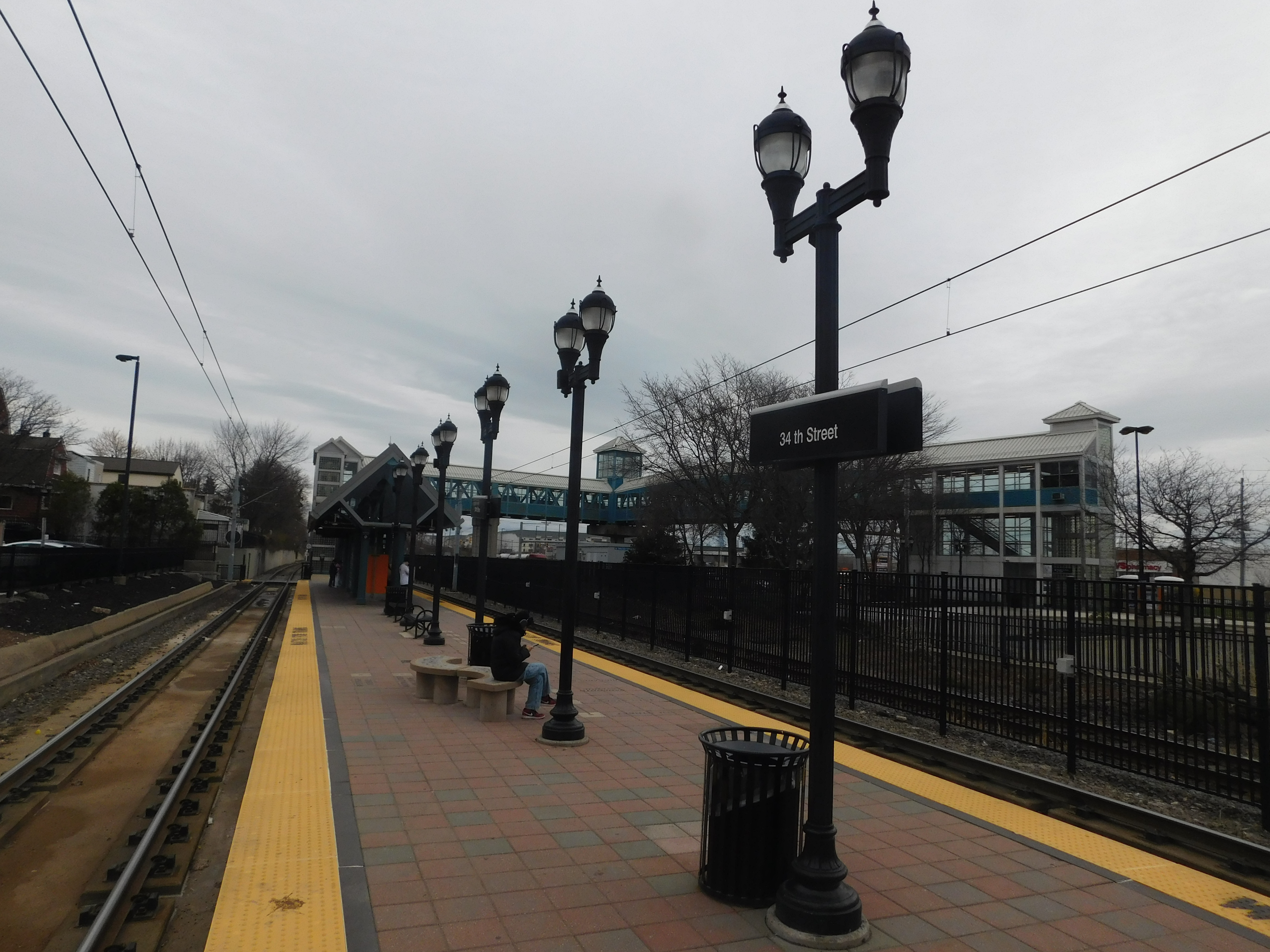
- 34th Street station as seen in March 2026.

General information
- Location: Avenue E at East 34th Street; Bayonne, New Jersey
- Coordinates: 40°40′19″N 74°06′29″W
- Owner: New Jersey Transit
- Platforms: 1 island platform
- Tracks: 2
- Connections: NYCT Bus: S89

Construction
- Structure type: Below-grade
- Parking: 417 spaces, 9 accessible spaces
- Cycle facilities: Yes
- Accessible: Yes

Other information
- Fare zone: 1

History
- Opened: April 15, 2000

Passengers
- 2025: 1,484 (average weekday)
- Rank: 16 of 24

Services
Preceding station	NJ Transit	Following station
22nd Street toward 8th Street	Bayonne–Hoboken	45th Street toward Hoboken
22nd Street toward 8th Street	Bayonne Flyer	45th Street toward Hoboken
Former services
Preceding station	Conrail	Following station
East 22nd Street toward Cranford	Cranford–Bayonne Shuttle	Terminus
Preceding station	Central Railroad of New Jersey	Following station
East 22nd Street toward Somerville	Somerville – Jersey City Local East 33rd Street	East 45th Street toward Jersey City
East 22nd Street toward Elizabethport	Suburban service to Elizabethport	East 45th Street toward Jersey City
Location

34th Street station is an active light rail station on the Hudson–Bergen Light Rail in the city of Bayonne, Hudson County, New Jersey. The third of four stations going northbound from 8th Street station, the station is located at the junction of Avenue E and East 34th Street. 34th Street station services trains of the 8th Street–Hoboken service between 8th Street and Hoboken Terminal and the special express Bayonne Flyer service. The station has a single island platform with two electrified tracks connected via an overpass next to State Route 440 and its 417-space parking lot.

== History ==
=== Jersey Central station ===
34th Street station was built just north of a former Central Railroad of New Jersey station, located at Avenue E and East 33rd Street. This station was known as East 33rd Street and, before that, it was known as Bayonne. The station opened on August 1, 1864 as part of a railroad connection between what would become Communipaw Terminal and the Bergen Point neighborhood. This was before the bridge across Newark Bay had been built which connected the railroad to the main line at Elizabethport. The depot was built on the westbound platform at the time and a new eastbound station was completed in 1901. The westbound depot was razed in 1962. East 33rd Street's eastbound depot became the main ticket agency, which was removed on April 30, 1967 as part of the Aldene Plan, which moved passenger service to the Lehigh Valley Railroad into Newark Penn Station. Passenger service through Bayonne and Jersey City was truncated to East 33rd Street as part of the Aldene Plan. The station depot was razed in 1969. Passenger service at East 33rd Street ended on August 6, 1978 when Conrail ended the shuttle between Cranford and East 33rd Street.

=== HBLR station ===
The modern station opened on April 15, 2000 as the terminus of the original minimum operating segment (MOS) of the Hudson–Bergen Light Rail.

== Station layout ==
The station has two tracks and a single island platform, along with an overhead pedestrian bridge to the parking lot on Route 440. 34th Street station is accessible for handicapped people as part of the Americans with Disabilities Act of 1990. As a result, there are elevators for the pedestrian bridge, along with grade-level train access on the platforms. The station serves local service between 8th Street station in Bayonne and Hoboken Terminal, along with the Bayonne Flyer, an express service between Bayonne and Hoboken.

== Connections ==
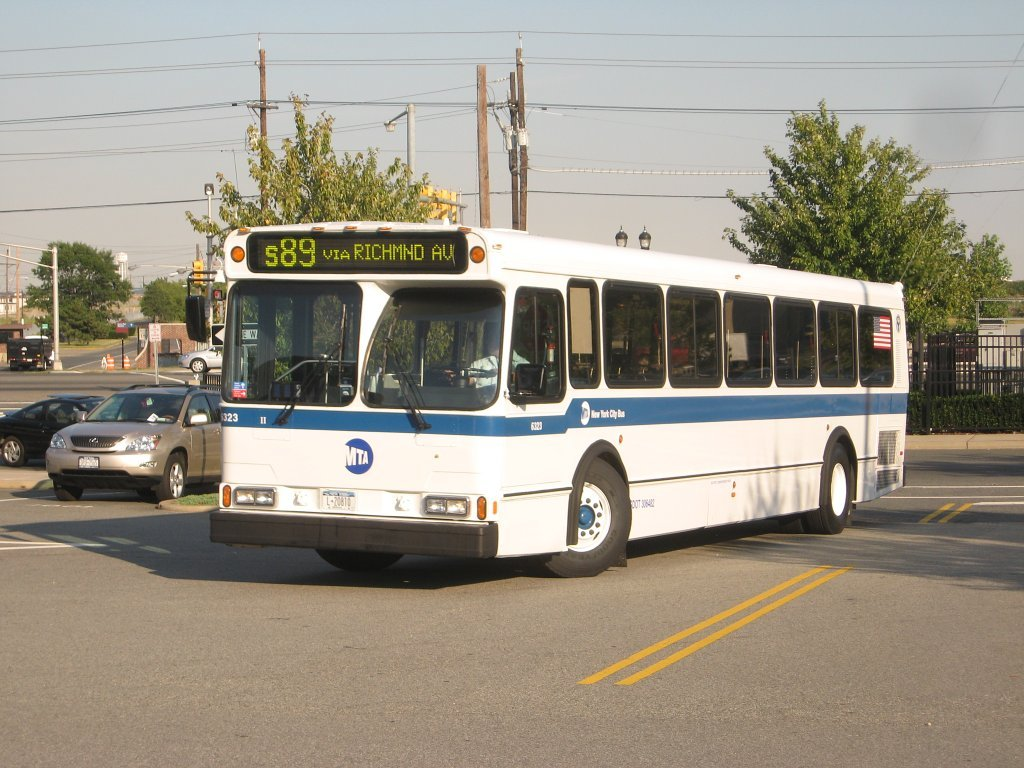
New York City Transit bus #6323 pulls into 34th Street on the S89 line

Since September 2007, the S89 bus route of the Metropolitan Transit Authority of the New York City metro area provides a link from 34th Street station to Staten Island. A 397-space park and ride lot has also been built at the station.

In 2005, eight PCC streetcars from the Newark City Subway were given to the Bayonne to be rehabilitated and operated along a proposed 2.5-mile (4.0 km) loop to connect the station to MOTBY, the former naval base being redeveloped as cruise port, residential and recreation area. As of 2015, plans call for a pedestrian bridge over Route 440 connecting the station to the new developments. In 2017, the North Jersey Transportation Planning Authority allocated funds for the study of bridge plans for which the City of Bayonne has $4 million to build. A concept development report for this bridge was completed in 2024, which gave a cost estimate of $10 million for constructing the preferred option of a fully enclosed overhead bridge.
