= Military Ocean Terminal at Bayonne =

Former shipping terminal in New Jersey, US

Coordinates: 40°39′49.3″N 74°4′8.7″W

- Bayonne, New Jersey

Site information
- Controlled by: United States Navy (1942–1967); United States Army (1967–1999)

Site history
- Built: 1939–1942
- In use: 1942–1999

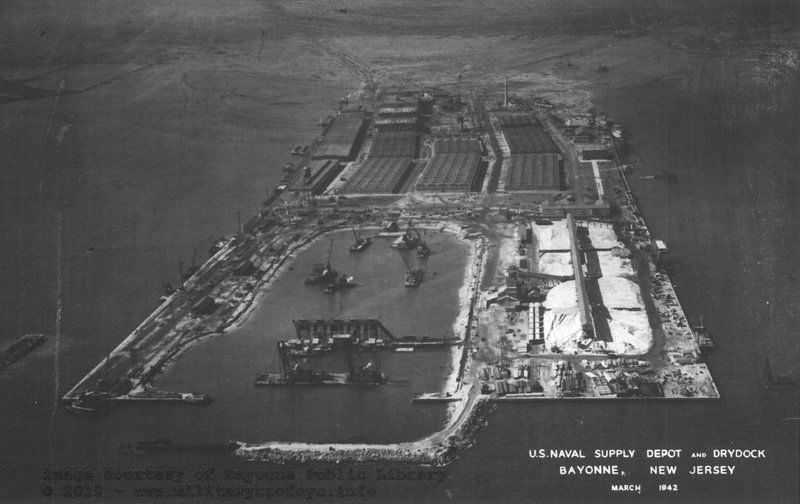
Bayonne Naval Drydock in 1942

Military Ocean Terminal at Bayonne (MOTBY) was a U.S. military ocean terminal located in the Port of New York and New Jersey which operated from 1967 to 1999. From 1942 to 1967 the site was the Bayonne Naval Drydock. The site is on Upper New York Bay south of Port Jersey on the eastern side of Bayonne, New Jersey. Since its closure, it has undergone maritime, residential, commercial, and recreational mixed-use development. Part of the Hudson River Waterfront Walkway runs along its perimeter.

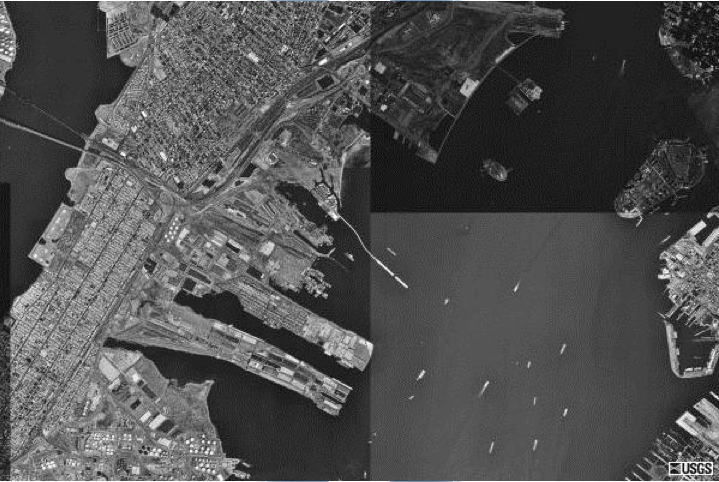
The west side of Upper New York Bay showing MOTBY, Port Jersey, and the no longer extant Caven Point pier extending into the harbor

== History ==
In 1932, a basic plan was initiated to build a port terminal. At the outbreak of World War II, the United States Navy became interested in the site for a large dry-dock and supply center. The Bayonne Naval Drydock base was opened by the Navy in 1942 as a logistics (Bayonne Naval Supply Depot) and repair base, well connected to the transportation network of the Northeast Corridor. After the war the site became port for part of the Atlantic Reserve Fleet or the Mothball Fleet, Atlantic Reserve Fleet, New York and later a Naval Inactive Ship Maintenance Facility (NISMF). The administration of Mayor James J. Donovan lobbied the Navy to locate the base in Bayonne and the trips by Washington officials, including the Secretary of the Navy, Frank Knox, resulted in the base being located in Bayonne. Mayor Donovan's role was finally recognized in December, 2015 when the Bayonne City officials and VFW groups dedicated a park in his honor at the base. The ceremony featured the Mayor, Town Council, many Veteran groups, and Donovan family descendants, including his son and daughter.

In 1967, the peninsula became a US Army base. It was a large shipping terminal by the standards of the day, and had the largest dry-dock on the eastern seaboard. Every type of roll-on/roll-off vessel in the Military Sealift Command (MSC) inventory could be accommodated. This capability was used during the Persian Gulf War (2 August 1990 – 28 February 1991) and during operations in Somalia and Haiti. Dozens of military units (men and equipment) were shipped through MOTBY, as was outsized cargo such as M1A2 tanks from as far as Fort Hood, Texas. The facility closed in 1999 under a US Base Realignment and Closure 1995 directive.

On August 8, 2021, the last two buildings of the facility were destroyed to make way for a UPS regional distribution hub. The demolition marked the end of a three year project to bring down the facility to make way for UPS.

== Redevelopment ==
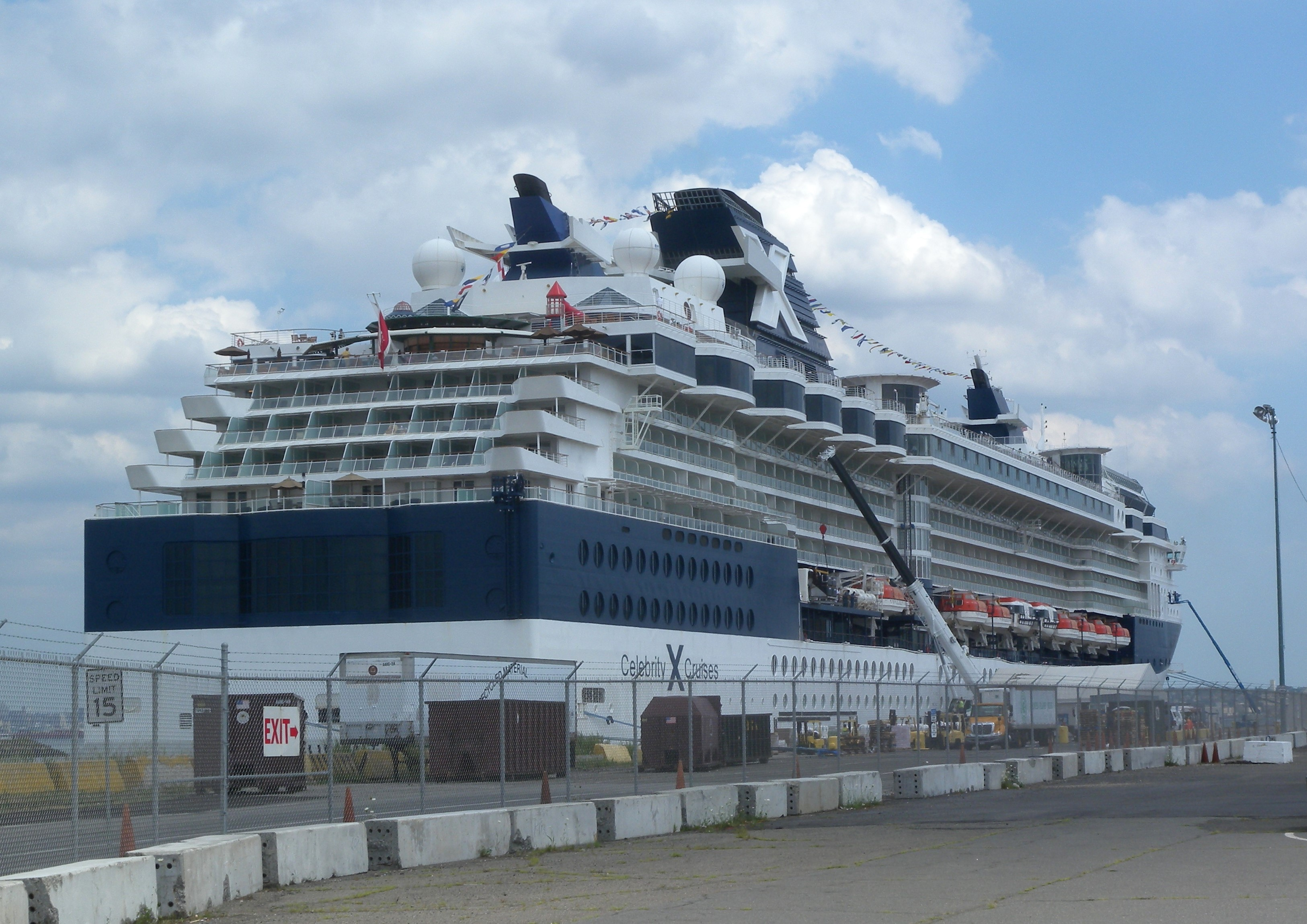
Cape Liberty Cruise Port

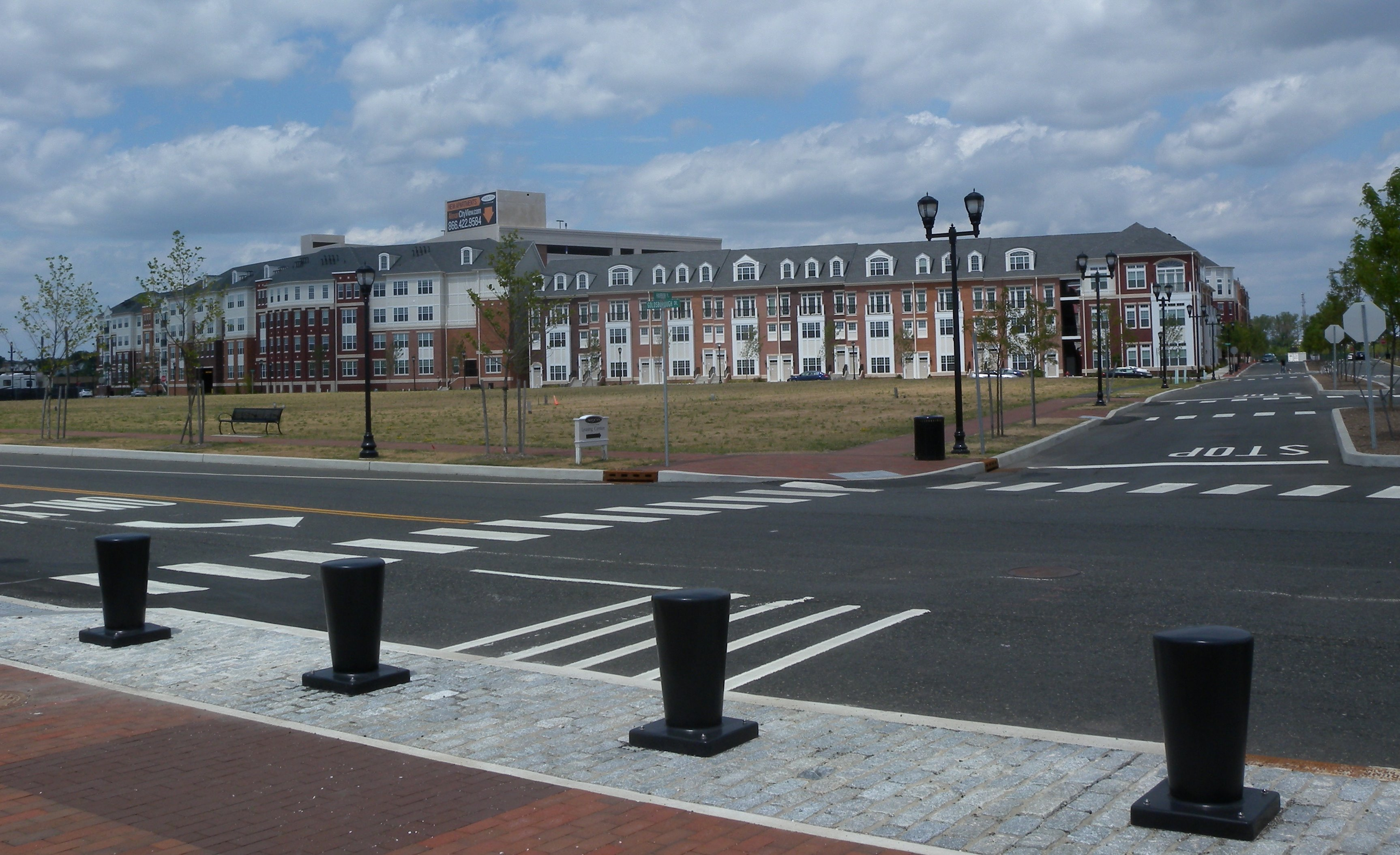
New housing at The Peninsula

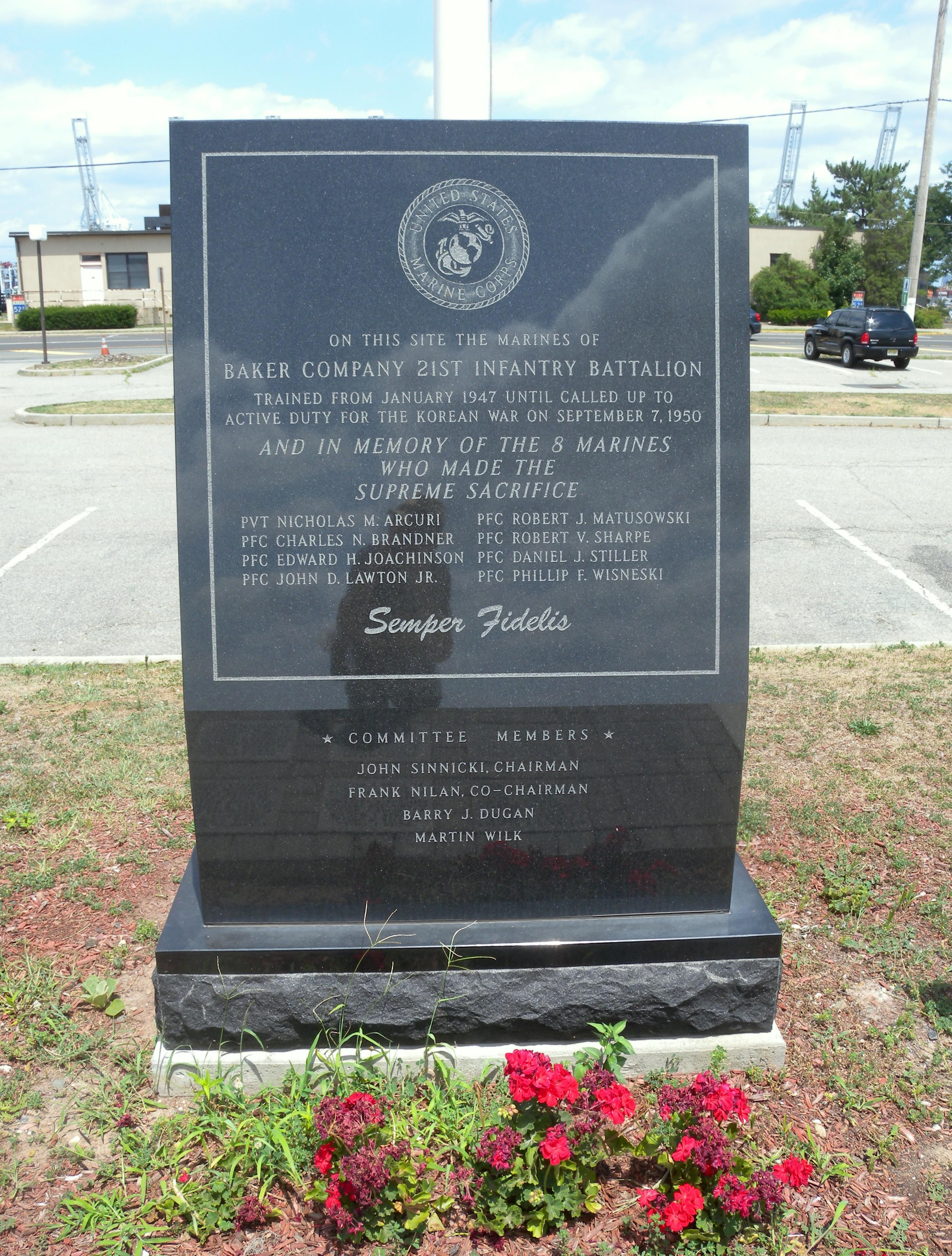
Marine Corps monument

After closure, bids to permanently berth the battleship USS New Jersey, which had been decommissioned at the Atlantic Reserve Fleet from 1948 to 1967, were unsuccessful. The long pier has since been renamed The Peninsula at Bayonne Harbor by the Bayonne Local Redevelopment Authority (BLRA) and is being redeveloped into a mixed-use waterfront community of residential, light industrial, commercial, and recreational space. Construction is planned to take place in phases, with one section of housing currently completed.

A memorial park for the Tear of Grief, commemorating September 11th, 2001 and the Cape Liberty Cruise Port are located at the end of the long pier. In 2005, eight PCC trolley cars from the Newark City Subway were given to the Bayonne to be rehabilitated and operated along a proposed 2.5-mile (4.0 km) loop to connect to the 34th Street station of the Hudson-Bergen Light Rail.

Much of the HBO prison drama Oz was filmed around MOTBY.

== Port Authority purchase ==
In 2010, the Port Authority of New York and New Jersey purchased 130 acres (0.53 km^{2}) along the waterfront for future use. The Port Authority said it would likely not use the land for housing as currently zoned, indicating that additional port facilities would be created. On July 29, the city council approved the sale at a price of $235 million, to be paid out over 24 years, much less than the city had hoped to earn from developing the property for housing. However economic conditions were not favorable to that project, which envisioned 6,700 housing units, and the city needed the cash to balance its budget. The Port Authority planned to develop the property as a container port capable of handling the larger container ships in service after the new, wider Panama Canal opened. Some of these new ships would not fit under the original Bayonne Bridge, preventing them from reaching the large container facilities at Port Newark and Port Elizabeth, however, the roadway on the Bayonne Bridge has been replaced with a higher one, removing that obstacle to shipping. Transhipment of containers to the national rail network from the property would be possible via the National Docks Secondary line using Lehigh Valley Railroad Bridge over Newark Bay, to the Long Dock Tunnel through Bergen Hill.

Originally, a condition of the land sale was that the monuments to United States Marines who fought in the Korean War, and the 100-foot (30 m) Tear of Grief would be relocated. However, the move is no longer planned.

In 2015, the Bayonne City Council settled lawsuits with the original developers of the property. As part of the settlement, the Port Authority agreed not to develop its land as a container port for 30 years. Residential development of the western and southern portions of the peninsula will go forward, including a pedestrian bridge over Route 440 connecting to the 34th Street HBLR station.

== Ferry service ==
The city rented land from PANYNJ and negotiated with SeaStreak to establish ferry service to Manhattan to begin in September 2020. With delays due to the COVID-19 pandemic and other causes, service was rescheduled to 2022, being further delayed into 2023 due to continued negotiations with PANYNJ, according to the city's mayor.

== See also ==
- New York Passenger Ship Terminal
- Brooklyn Cruise Terminal
- Port Jersey
