= Newark Bay Bridge (railroad) =

Railroad bridge connecting Elizabethport and Bayonne

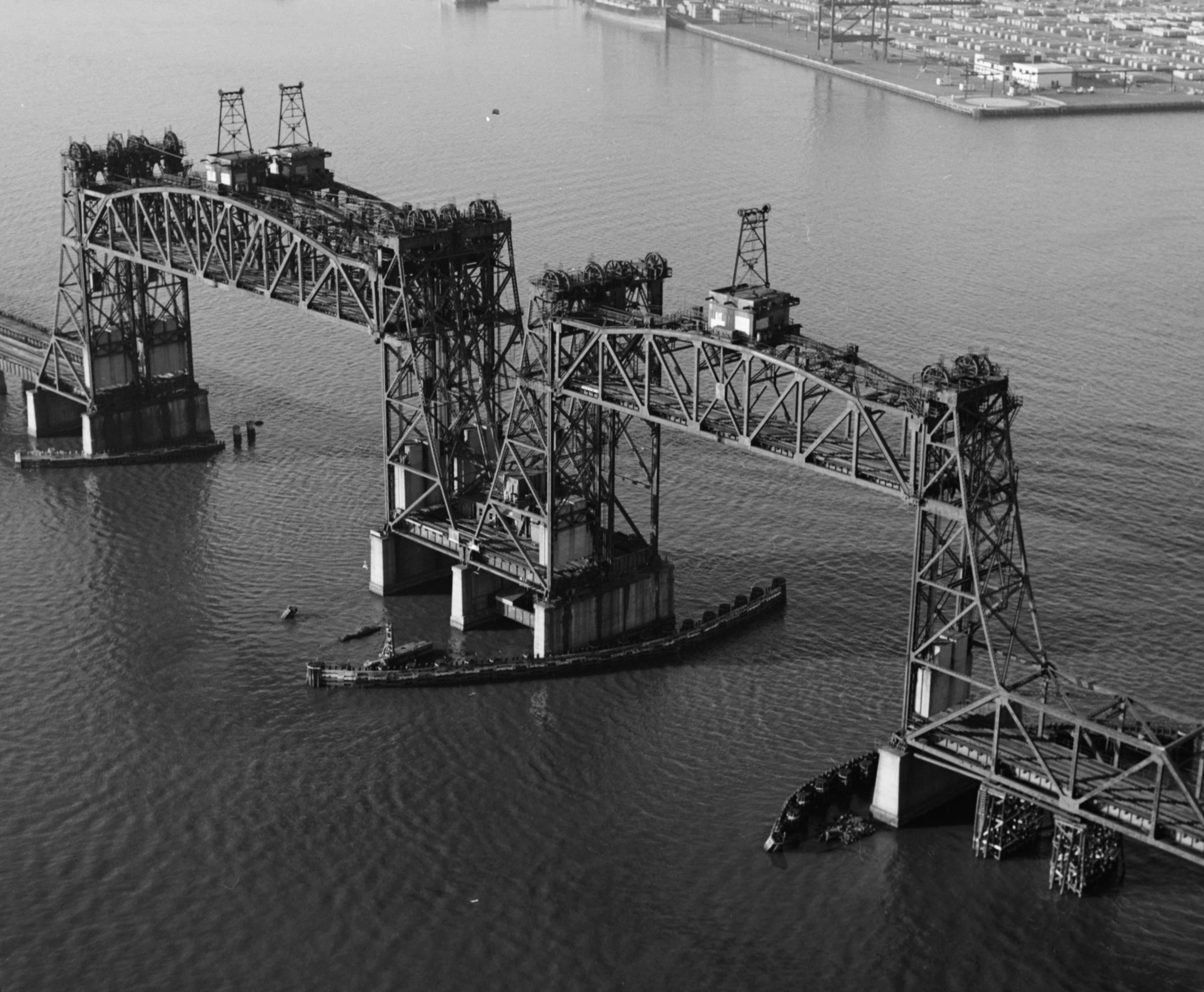
- The Central Railroad of New Jersey Newark Bay Bridge with its lifts raised (one of which had already been destroyed by collision); it was demolished in the 1980s
- Coordinates: 40°39′16″N 74°09′00″W
- Carries: Central Railroad of New Jersey
- Crosses: Newark Bay
- Locale: New Jersey

Characteristics
- Design: Vertical lift bridge, through Parker truss
- Total length: 2 miles (3.2 km)
- Width: 4 tracks
- Longest span: 299 feet (91 m)
- Clearance above: 135 feet (41 m)

History
- Designer: Waddell & Son
- Opened: 1926
- Closed: 1978
- Replaces: Newark Bay Bridge (1904) (bascule)

Location
- Interactive map of Newark Bay Bridge

Newark Bay Bridge (1904)
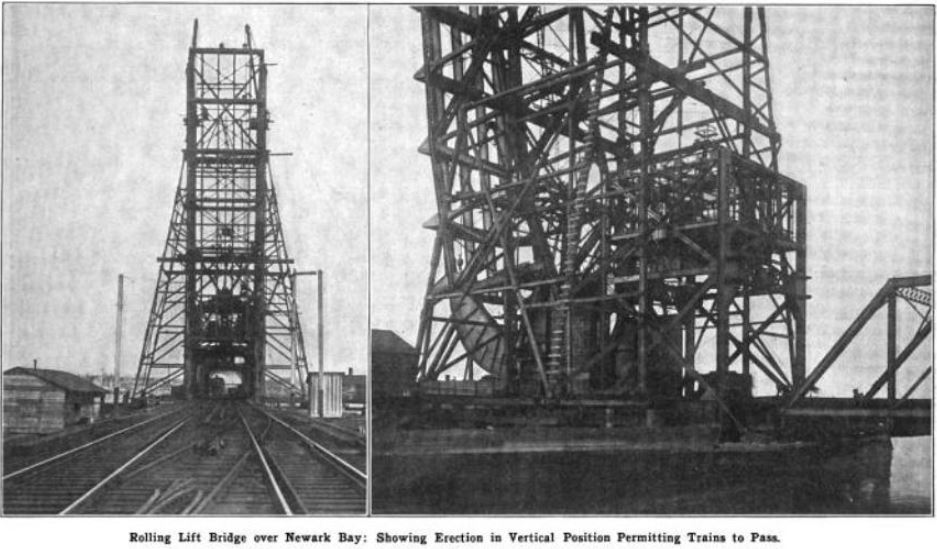
- The second bridge, under construction, above the existing railroad trestle. (1904)
- Coordinates: 40°39′16″N 74°09′00″W
- Carries: Central Railroad of New Jersey; Philadelphia & Reading Railroad
- Crosses: Newark Bay
- Locale: New Jersey

Characteristics
- Design: Scherzer rolling lift bascule bridge
- Total length: 2 miles (3.2 km)
- Width: 2 tracks
- Longest span: 120 feet (37 m)

History
- Opened: 1904
- Replaces: 1887 Newark Bay Bridge (swing-bridge)
- Replaced by: 1926 Newark Bay Bridge (vertical-lift)

Newark Bay Bridge (1887)
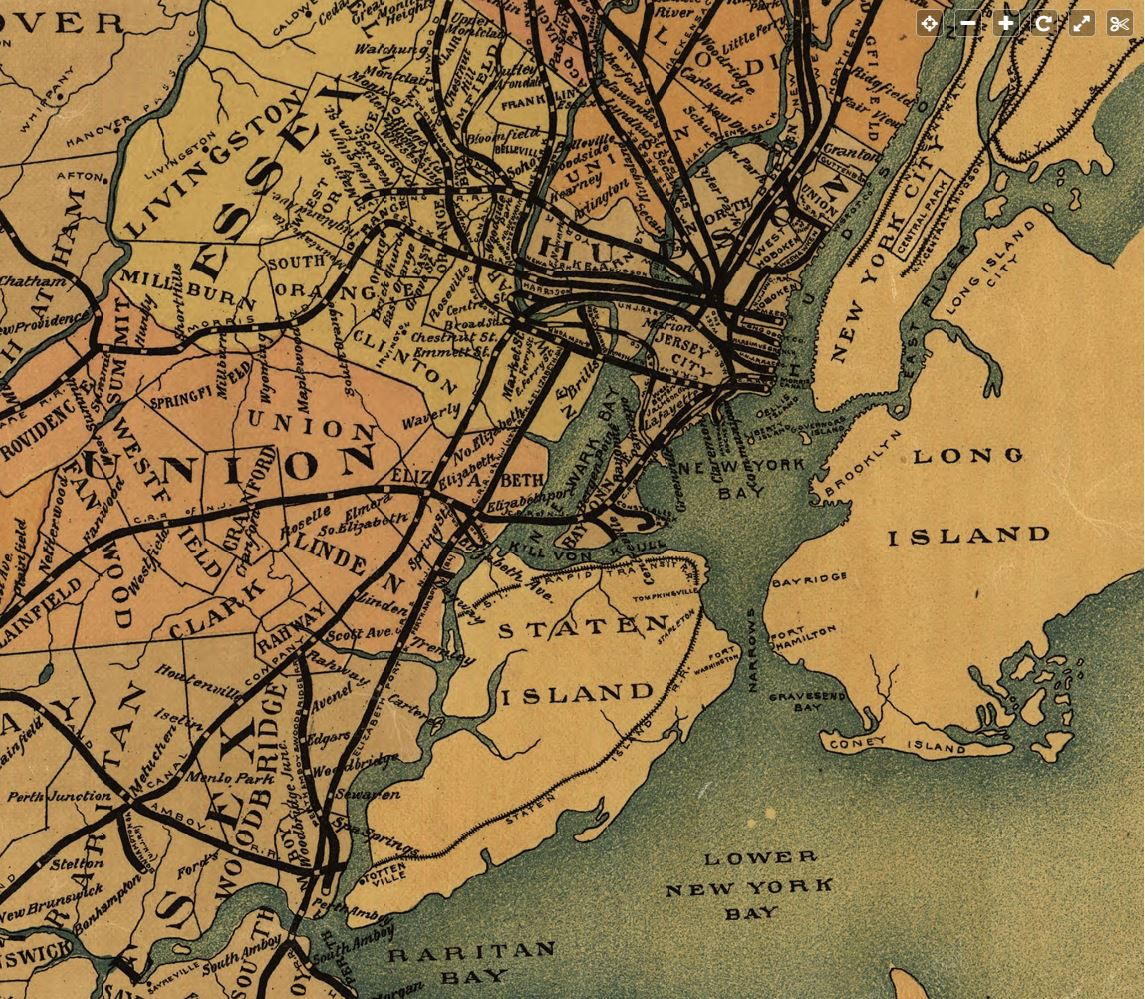
- Newark-area map of New Jersey railroads (1887)
- Coordinates: 40°39′16″N 74°09′00″W
- Crosses: Newark Bay
- Locale: New Jersey

Characteristics
- Design: Swing bridge
- Total length: 2 miles (3.2 km)
- Width: 2 tracks

History
- Opened: 1887
- Replaced by: 1904 Newark Bay Bridge (bascule)

Map of rail lines around Essex, Hudson, and Union counties in New Jersey. The grey CNJ line from Bayonne to Elizabeth was carried by the CNJ's Newark Bay Bridge

The Newark Bay Bridge of the Central Railroad of New Jersey (CNJ) was a railroad bridge in Northern New Jersey that connected Elizabethport and Bayonne at the southern end of Newark Bay. Its third and final incarnation was a four-track vertical-lift design that opened in 1926, replacing a bascule bridge from 1904 which superseded the original swing bridge from 1887. The bridge served the main line of the CNJ, carrying daily interstate trains as well as commuter trains.

== History ==
Between 1887 and the late 1980s, the rail bridge across Newark Bay existed in three forms. As train service grew in both frequency and complexity through the early 20th century, the bridge was replaced twice to accommodate additional trackage and heavier trains.

=== Original bridge (1887) ===
The first railway structure to span the bay was erected in 1887, and consisted of simple wooden trestle pile bridge approaches joined near the eastern side of the waterway by a steel center-pier swing bridge. Built within a navigable channel, the moveable bridge allowed marine traffic from Kill Van Kull to access the Port of Newark.

At the turn of the twentieth century, the bridge was a main artery of both the Central Railroad of New Jersey and Philadelphia & Reading Railroad, but its light and outmoded construction had reportedly become inadequate to handle the heavier and more-frequent trains of the day. Plans to replace the span were considered as early as 1901 and solidified by August 1902, with engineers settling on a Scherzer rolling lift bascule bridge as the preferred design and a budget of at least $1,000,000.

=== Bascule bridge (1904) ===
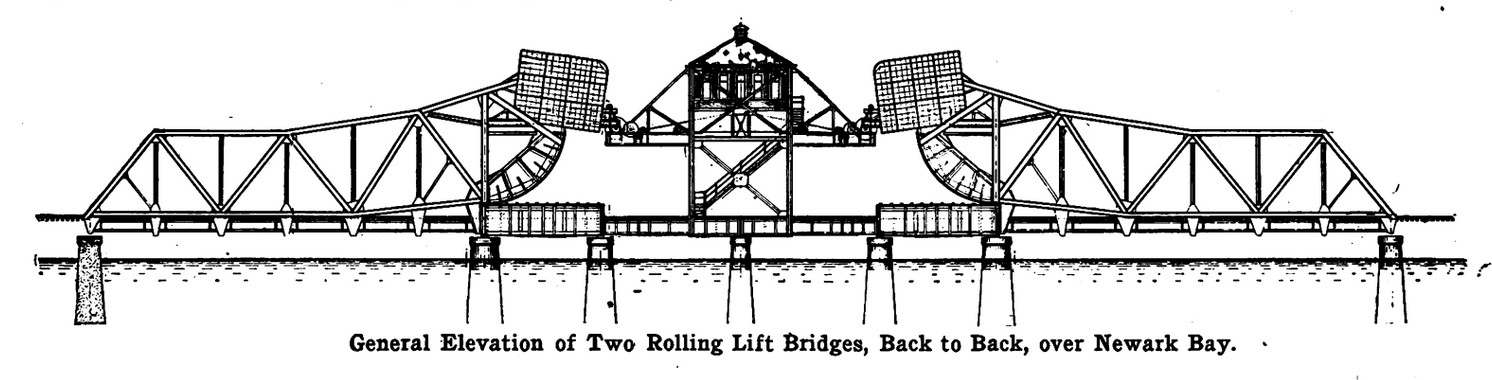
Newark Bay Bridge (1904)

The new movable bridge, configured as twin dual-track mirrored bascule leaves, promised many benefits in comparison to the outdated swing-bridge. Its twin 75 horsepower (56 kW) gasoline engines could quickly raise its superstructures to the minimum required distance to accommodate low-height vessels like barges (which made up roughly 80% of the channel's traffic), and the rails could be more thoroughly secured to the bridge deck at its leaf joints (thus permitting higher train speeds). Additionally, another parallel span could be added if it became necessary to double the crossing's trackage– especially considering that four land-side tracks already met the bridge on either end of its approaches.

Construction of the bridge was unique in that it was completed in phases along the existing active right-of-way, all while ensuring uninterrupted rail service. The first phase involved reconstruction of the fixed trestle approaches; train operations were restricted to a single track while the other half of the trestle was demolished and replaced with "concrete on timber platforms supported by piles." The bascule's western leaf was then built (in the upright position) directly on-top-of the existing trestle, allowing trains to pass through its unfinished superstructure. On February 14, 1904, that section of trestle was demolished and the leaf was lowered for the first time. Following rapid installation of the railbed, the new bascule immediately entered service with a total downtime of less than 12 hours. In the following weeks, the existing swing-bridge section was replaced with a temporary trestle and the eastern leaf completed in a similar manner to its twin.

=== Vertical-lift bridge (1926) ===
The lift spans were a pair of two-track spans over two separate shipping channels; the longer span being 299 feet (91 m) long, while the shorter span was 210.75 feet (64.24 m), giving a navigable width of 216 feet (66 m) and 134 feet (41 m) respectively. Vertical clearance was 135 feet (41 m) open and 35 feet (11 m) closed. Each span was capable of independent movement, as well as any combination of tandem movements. Bridge movement, interlocking, and signals were controlled from a large staffed structure on the operational midpoint between the east and west draw spans and above the tracks.

During World War II, the bridge was a critical piece of the Port of New York and New Jersey's logistic network, allowing 300 or more trains per day to supply troops and materials for American efforts in the European theatre.

Despite the operational flexibility and safeguards built into the bridge, increases in marine traffic and ship size only made the bridge a greater maritime hazard. At the same time, however, decline in rail traffic did not make it any less of a hazard to the railroad. On September 15, 1958, a commuter train plunged off the south span which had been opened for marine traffic, killing 48 people, including former New York Yankees second baseman Snuffy Stirnweiss. On May 19, 1966, the French freighter M.V. Washington collided with the northeast lift span, rendering two tracks unusable. Despite an eventual 2nd Circuit judgment in CNJ's favor, the span was never repaired, as the two affected tracks were deemed redundant by the railroad due to the sharp decline in rail traffic and the momentous change in the railroad's operations, which occurred less than a year after the accident.

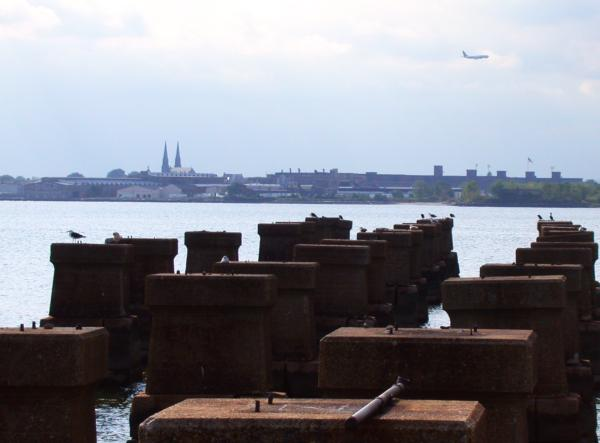
Cassions in 1981

After the Aldene Plan went into effect on April 30, 1967, the only passenger service on the bridge was the Bayonne-Cranford shuttle, known as the "Scoot". The last freight train crossed the bridge in 1976, prior to the formation of Conrail; the last passenger train left Bayonne's Eighth Street Station on August 6, 1978. Despite Bayonne's efforts to save the bridge, demolition of the central lift spans began in July 1980 after the United States Coast Guard declared the structure a navigational hazard to ships. The trestle and approaches were removed in 1987–1988 when it became apparent that a replacement span was no longer feasible. Removal of the piers began in 2012.

== See also ==
- List of bridges documented by the Historic American Engineering Record in New Jersey
- List of bridges, tunnels, and cuts in Hudson County, New Jersey
- Newark Bay rail accident
