= 8th Street station (Hudson–Bergen Light Rail) =

Hudson–Bergen Light Rail station in Bayonne, New Jersey

8th Street Station
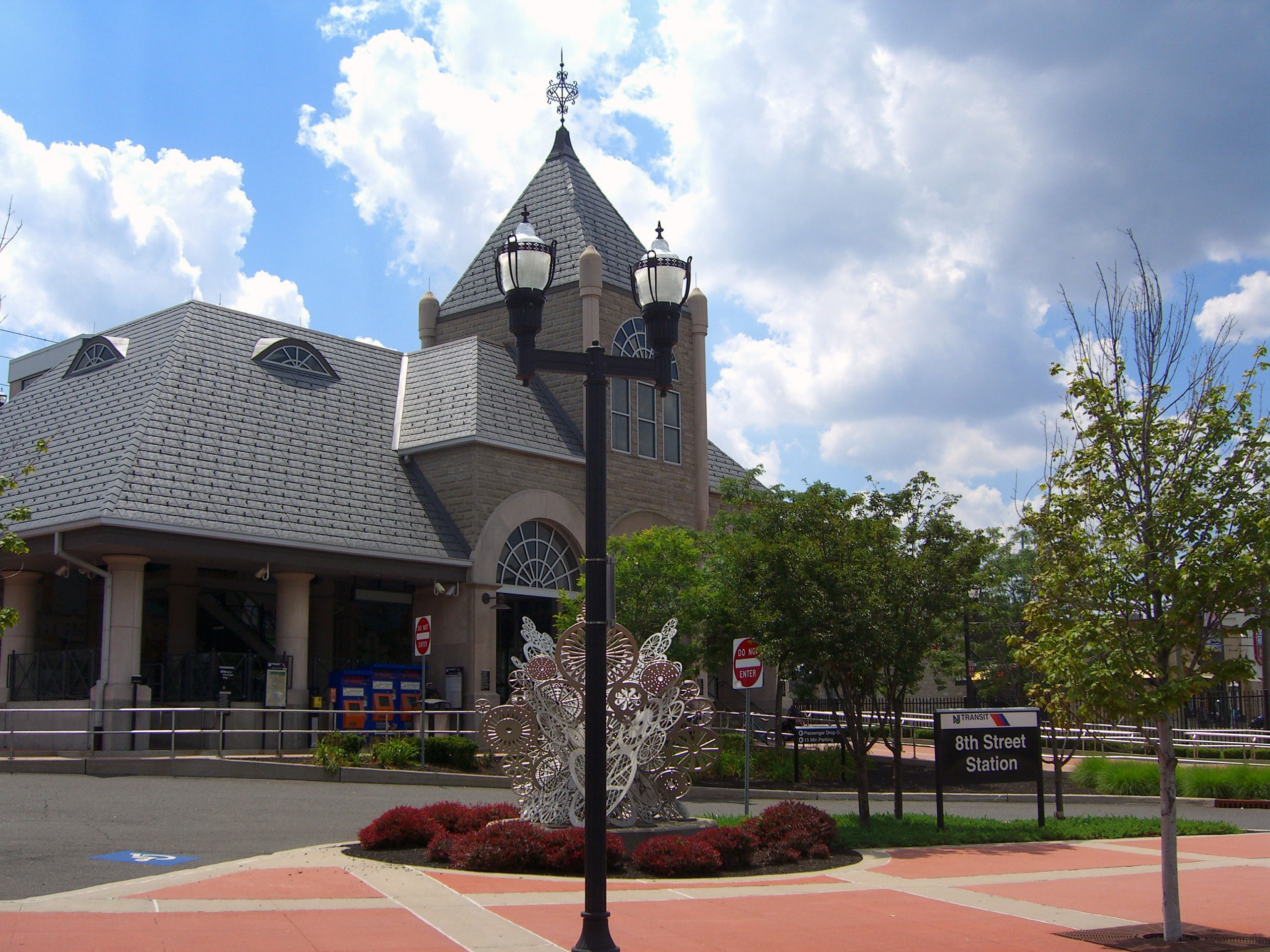
- 8th Street station headhouse and the sculpture Locomotion in July 2016

General information
- Location: 40 West 8th Street; Bayonne, New Jersey
- Coordinates: 40°39′14″N 74°07′37″W
- Owner: New Jersey Transit
- Platforms: 1 island platform
- Tracks: 2
- Connections: NJ Transit Bus: 10, 12, 81, 119, 120; Bayonne Bridge

Construction
- Structure type: Elevated
- Parking: Yes
- Cycle facilities: Yes
- Accessible: Yes

Other information
- Fare zone: 1

History
- Opened: January 31, 2011

Passengers
- 2025: 1,860 (average weekday)
- Rank: 9 of 24

Services
Preceding station	NJ Transit	Following station
Terminus	Bayonne–Hoboken	22nd Street toward Hoboken
Terminus	Bayonne Flyer	22nd Street toward Hoboken
Former services
Preceding station	Conrail	Following station
Elizabethport toward Cranford	Cranford–Bayonne Shuttle	East 22nd Street toward East 33rd Street
Preceding station	Central Railroad of New Jersey	Following station
Elizabeth toward Somerville	Somerville – Jersey City Local	East 22nd Street toward Jersey City
Avenue A toward Somerville	Somerville – Jersey City Local	East 22nd Street toward Jersey City
Elizabethport Terminus	Suburban service to Elizabethport	East 22nd Street toward Jersey City
Location

8th Street station is a station on the Hudson–Bergen Light Rail (HBLR) in the Bergen Point section of the city of Bayonne, New Jersey. The southernmost stop in Bayonne, 8th Street station serves as the southern terminus of the Hudson–Bergen Light Rail. Located on an elevated track next to Route 440, the station is accessible at the intersection of Avenue C and West 8th Street. The station, unlike the rest of the line, has a full station depot that doubles as accessibility to tracks per the Americans with Disabilities Act of 1990. The depot is two stories high and contains elevators and access to the platform, which is an island platform with two tracks. East of the station, the tracks merge into one to reach 22nd Street station. The station serves tracks for the local service to Hoboken Terminal along with an express service known as the Bayonne Flyer. The station opened on January 31, 2011 as an extension of service from 22nd Street.

The design of the 8th Street station depot is a similar design to the former West 8th Street station on the Central Railroad of New Jersey that served Bayonne from August 1, 1864–August 6, 1978, when Conrail discontinued service. The station headhouse caught fire on October 19, 1977. Conrail officials abandoned the fire-ravaged station depot. After complaints from local organizations about vandalism and loitering, demolition of the station depot began in February 1979.

== History ==
=== Jersey Central station ===
Railroad service through the Bergen Point section of Bayonne began on August 1, 1864 with the extension of the Central Railroad of New Jersey from its terminal at Elizabethport to Jersey City. As part of construction, a new bridge across Newark Bay opened as well as a station at Eighth Street, at the time population center of the city.

The original station depot at Bergen Point station was a two-story brick structure with wooden overhang. Despised by locals, the Central Railroad of New Jersey began construction of new railroad facilities in Bayonne in 1891. Bergen Point station would receive a new station depot, and the old depot would be moved to the Avenue A station further south in Bergen Point. This also included construction of a fourth track through the city in preparation of the widening of the Newark Bay Bridge.

As part of construction, the station's ticket and telegraph offices were moved to a temporary structure. However, instead of moving the old station to Avenue A, the railroad changed plans when they abandoned the older structure on August 11, 1891. Instead of moving the old depot, it would just be razed. In its place, a new stone station depot would be built on the site. The station would be 73 feet (22 m) long with an overhanging roof and porte-cochère. With the overhang, the entire station would be 93 feet (28 m) long and 37.3 feet (11.4 m) wide. The new interior would be made of hardwood with antique fireplaces and modern ventilation.

The railroad announced the new depot would be finished by the time it was to open April 15, 1892. However, due to delays, the station depot would not open until April 24.

Service at West 8th Street station remained stable until the opening of the Aldene Plan on April 30, 1967. On that day, Central Railroad service to Communipaw Terminal in Jersey City ended, being replaced by a shuttle to East 33rd Street station from Cranford. All direct service east of Cranford went to Newark Pennsylvania Station. This shuttle remained intact into the era of Conrail, ending on August 6, 1978.

The station depot at West 8th Street fell into disrepair and caught fire on October 19, 1977. Conrail rescued what they could and abandoned the depot. After complaints about being a local nuisance in its damaged state, demolition of the station depot began in February 1979.

=== HBLR station ===
New Jersey Department of Transportation and New Jersey Transit announced in 1995 the construction of a new light rail line in Hudson County and Bergen County. Using the former Central Railroad of New Jersey right-of-way operated by Conrail, the agency proposed construction of 33 new stations in the two counties. This included five stations in the city of Bayonne. Stations would be operated at West Fifth Street, West Eighth Street, East 22nd Street, East 34th Street and East 45th Street. For West Eighth Street, the station would be built on the site of former Central Railroad depot, demolished 18 years prior. However, unlike it its predecessor, the new station would be built to utilize and elevated right-of-way. A 52-space parking lot would be built at the corner of Avenue C and Eighth Street, at the time a vacant lot. With accessibility to 4,300 people in a 1/4-mile (0.40 km) area, the station would be a primary opportunity for transit-oriented development.

The first operating segment of the Hudson–Bergen Light Rail opened on April 15, 2000 between the 34th Street station and Exchange Place station in Jersey City, along with the West Side Avenue branch. An extension to 22nd Street station opened on November 15, 2003.

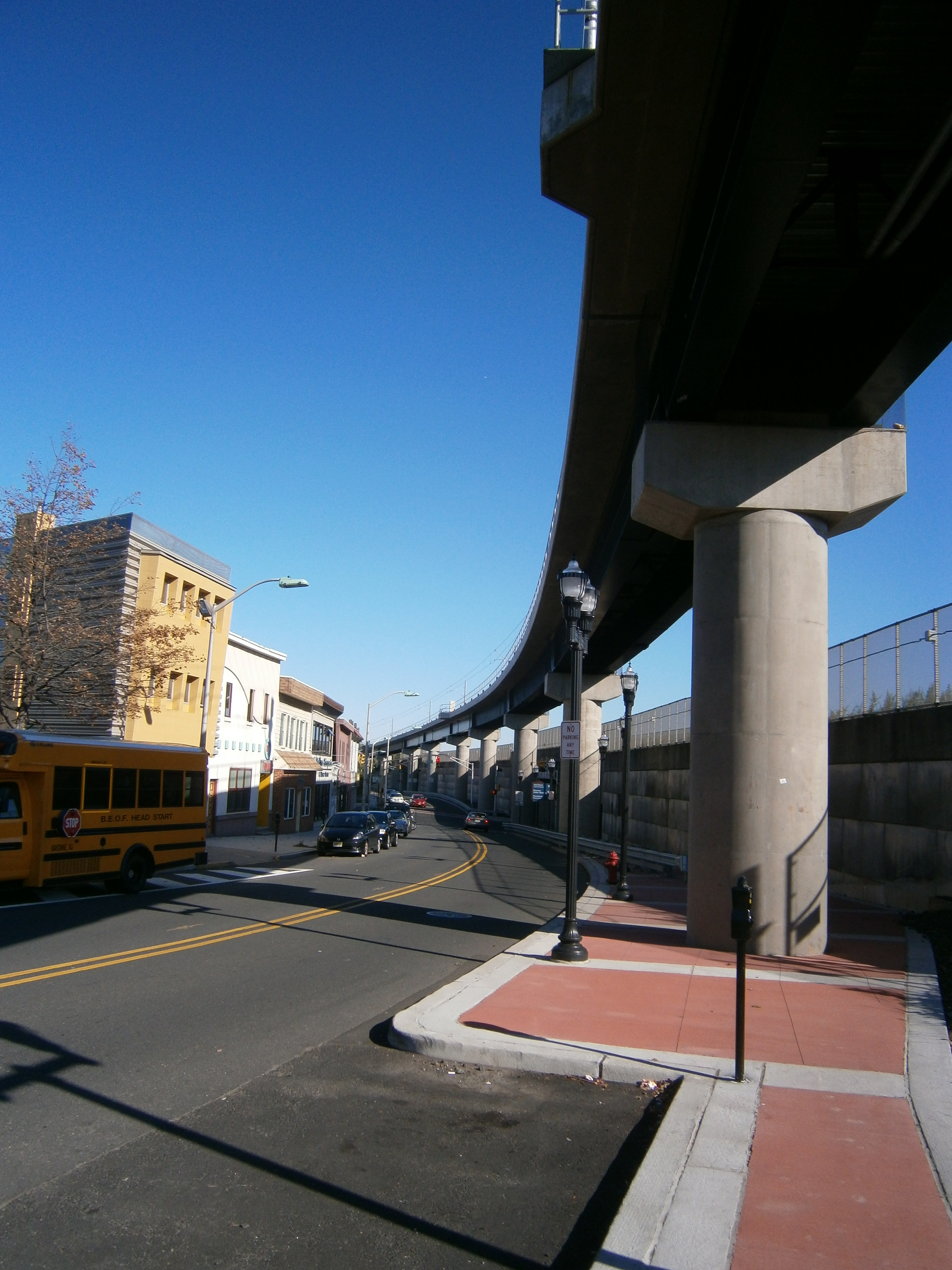
The single-track viaduct built to reach 8th Street station from 22nd Street station in Bayonne

In October 2004, New Jersey Transit released designs for the new 8th Street station. Joseph Doria, the Mayor of Bayonne, announced that the new station would be made into a replica of the former Central Railroad depot. Doria stated that an elevator would be installed to meet the new elevated track, which would be completed within 30 months from 22nd Street. The new station would include a single island platform with windscreen shelter, accessible from the replica station depot. However, New Jersey Transit stated via a spokesperson that would be several years before the station would open and had no estimate for how much the extension would cost.

New Jersey Transit announced their capital plan in August 2006 to give $15 million to fund extension of the light rail to 8th Street. On September 13, the company announced in a press release that they approved the beginning of preliminary work design for the construction of the new light rail extension to 8th Street station. At that time of announcement, New Jersey Transit speculated that construction would begin in 2008 and be finished near the end of 2009, awarding the contract to a construction firm during 2007. However, the agency awarded the $58.4 million (2008 USD) extension on April 17, 2008 to George Harms Construction of Howell. This contract was all-inclusive, including the rail extension, viaducts, track work and other necessary improvements, along with the new station and amenities. The expectation was that construction would begin later in 2008 and finished in 2010.

New Jersey Transit officials held an official groundbreaking ceremony on October 15, 2008. The Executive Director of New Jersey Transit Richard Sarles, United States Senator Bob Menendez, the Mayor of Bayonne Terrence Malloy and United States Congressman Albio Sires all attended the ceremony.

Completion of the new station wrapped up in January 2011. At a ceremony on January 31, Menendez, Sires, Mayor Mark Smith and Executive Director James Weinstein opened the new station. Ceremonies included a special train that boarded at 34th Street station and rode down to 8th Street. The new station included two new bus stops that would provide access to the no. 81 (Bayonne–Jersey City) and no. 120 (Bayonne–New York City) buses. Unlike the original plan for 52 parking spaces, the station included just a 10-space "kiss and ride" lot for short term parking. Three art installations were built with the construction, including a mural on the station entrance, artistic windscreens on the platform and a stainless steel sculpture in the plaza. In all, the station and 1 mile (1.6 km) extension cost the agency $100 million to design and construct.

== Proposed extensions to Staten Island ==
From the start of planning, New Jersey Transit considered Staten Island an important market for the construction of the light rail. In 1990, over 30 percent of Staten Island residents used public transportation for work. This included bus and the Staten Island Ferry. 65 percent of commuters would use a car. In the 1990 United States census, surveys showed that almost 33 percent of commuters worked in Manhattan while ~2,500 residents worked in Hudson County.

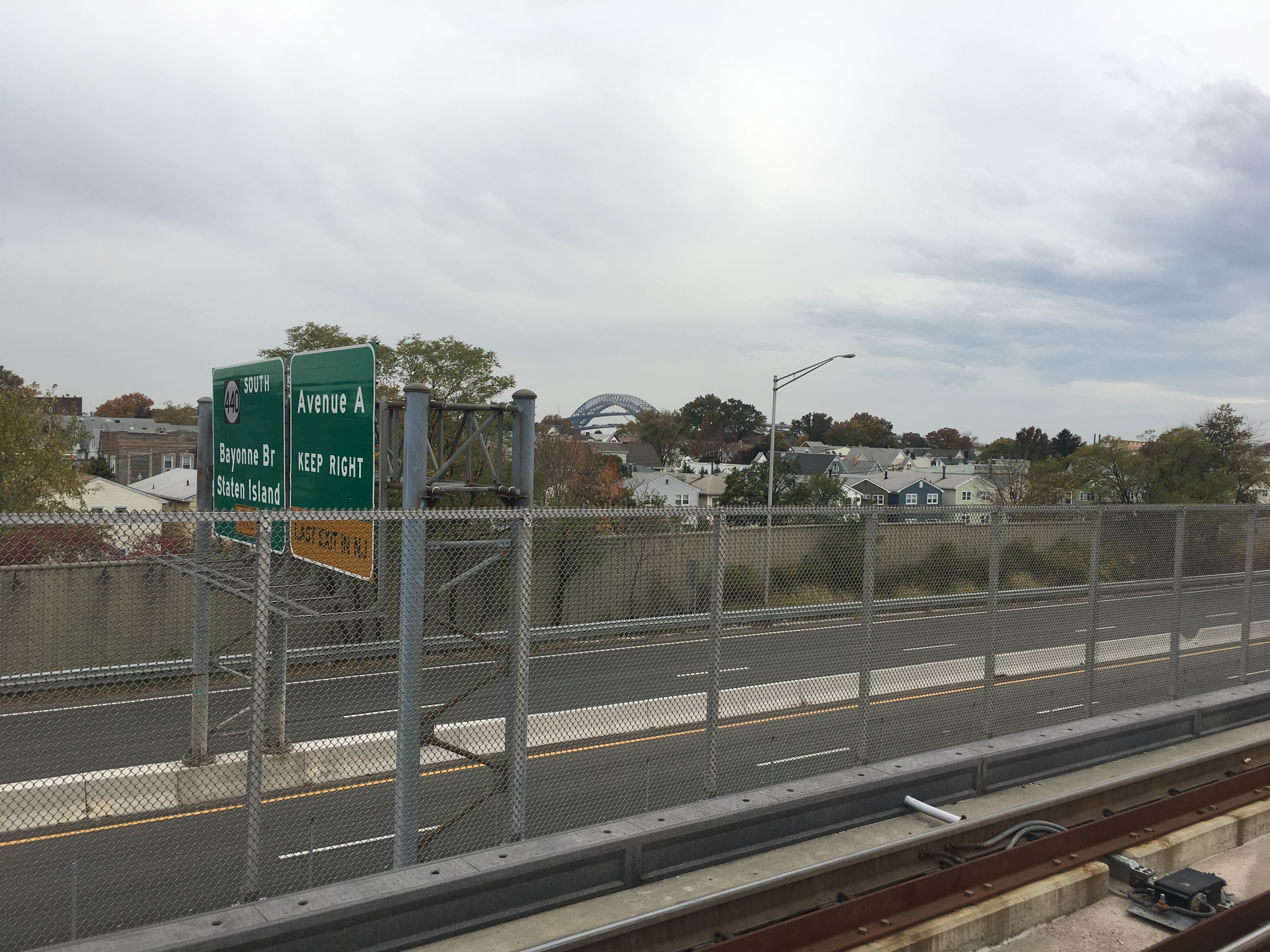
The Bayonne Bridge viewed from the 8th Street platform

In 2007, the Metropolitan Transportation Authority (MTA) introduced a 12.5-mile (20.1 km) limited-stop bus route from the junction of Richmond Avenue and Hylan Boulevard in the Eltingville section of Staten Island to the 34th Street station in Bayonne. Designated as the S89, the bus route operates a rush hour peak service to help eliminate commuting over the Bayonne Bridge to access the Hudson–Bergen Light Rail's park and ride stops.

Weeks prior to the opening of the 8th Street station, the Port Authority of New York and New Jersey announced their plans to raise the roadbed of the Bayonne Bridge 64 feet (20 m) higher than its 151-foot (46 m) clearance over the Kill Van Kull to help freight and cargo ships pass underneath the bridge. A spokesperson for New Jersey Transit noted they had been in discussions with the Port Authority about extending the light rail south over the bridge to Staten Island, but nothing concrete had been agreed to. The spokesperson noted that the agency was giving the Port Authority technical data for such an extension but it would require further study to look at a serious extension.

After pressure from the Staten Island Economic Development Corporation (SIEDC), the MTA announced a study in May 2017 would be done to investigate alternative non-car transportation routes for the West Shore of Staten Island. The SIEDC proposed a light rail service from the Richmond Valley station of the Staten Island Railway, making eight further stops in the borough, reaching Elm Park, where it would cross the bridge and a connection would be made with the Hudson–Bergen Light Rail.

In April 2019, the SIEDC introduced a new solution to commuters from Staten Island to Bayonne. A proposal birthed in 2015, the new alternative would be a 2.5-mile (4.0 km) long gondola between Richmond and Forest Avenues in Port Richmond to the 8th Street station. The new gondola would be a 13-minute ride with 163 cabins built to transport as much as 3,000 people per hour. The gondola would mean it would take 55–70 minutes to reach various parts of Manhattan. The choice of its location in Port Richmond was to provide access to nearby public transportation. The gondola would cost $168 million. However, Bayonne Mayor Jimmy Davis stated that they were left out of the loop about the announcement despite the city contributing $10,000 to the study.

In March 2020, the MTA introduced the results of the 2017 study to help improve service on Staten Island to places in New Jersey. Along with a Tottenville–Newark Liberty International Airport branch, the agency suggested a new rapid transit route for Bayonne commuters. This new route would begin at the Arthur Kill station of the Staten Island Railway. The bus would use a dedicated right-of-way along State Route 440, the Korean War Veterans Parkway and Richmond Avenue. In the Elm Park section of Staten Island, it would be in mixed traffic and not on a dedicated right-of-way. This bus would make 13 stops, ending at the 8th Street station. However, the project had no funding for any studies. The COVID-19 pandemic shut down all studies and capital project work until January 2022. The MTA did state that even if a bus rapid transit service opened, it would not eliminate the potential for a future light rail project.

== Station layout and services ==
8th Street station contains a two-level station headhouse, designed to match the 1892 Victorian-era depot that once stood on the site of the current station. This station depot contains stairs to climb from street level to the tracks and an elevator for those in need of assistance. 8th Street station's track area involves two electrified tracks split by an island platform. The stop contains three separate pieces of artwork. A stainless steel sculpture known as Locomotion exists at street level in the plaza. The sculpture, designed by artist Tom Nussbaum, noted the city of Bayonne's railroad history using railroad locomotive wheels for its shape. In the entranceway, Richard Haas' Bayonne: Port City of Homes and Industry mural welcomes riders. This mural shows various views of Bayonne, including the Bayonne Bridge, the city's Waterfront and other businesses and residences in the municipality. The windscreens on the platform were made by Trevor Wilson. Known as Silver Stain and Light, the windscreen contained glass blocks with etching and glass paints to provide a transparent design with light interaction.

Services departing 8th Street began at 5:11 a.m. on weekdays, with the first Hoboken Terminal-bound train. The first Bayonne Flyer express train departs at 6:33 a.m. The last train northbound departs 8th Street station at 1:09 a.m. the following day. On weekends, the first train departs at 6:09 a.m. while the last operates at 1:24 a.m. the following day. The first train arriving on weekdays reaches 8th Street station at 5:18 a.m. while the last arrives at 2:35 a.m. the next day. On weekends, the first train arrives at 8th Street station at 6:15 a.m. while the last train arrives at 2:35 a.m.

8th Street station has access to five bus lines. Four are operated by New Jersey Transit. At the station itself, the no. 81 (Bayonne–Jersey City) and no. 120 (Bayonne–Downtown Manhattan) are accessible. On nearby JFK Boulevard (CR 501), access is available to the no. 10, which operates betweens 2nd Street in Bayonne and Journal Square Transportation Center in Jersey City and the no. 119, which operates between Bayonne and Port Authority Bus Terminal. Broadway Bus also operates a bus a block east on Broadway.

== Bibliography ==
- Papers Read Before the Historical Society of Hudson County. Jersey City, New Jersey: Historical Society of Hudson County. 1908.
- Federal Transit Administration (1995). Turnkey Demonstration Program. Federal Transit Administration.
- Middleton, Kathleen M. (1995). Images of America: Bayonne. Mount Pleasant, South Carolina: Arcadia Publishing. ISBN 9780738557250.
- New Jersey Transit (1995). Bayonne Extension Supplemental Draft Environmental Impact Statement. Newark, New Jersey: New Jersey Transit.
- Whitcomb, Royden Page (1904). First History of Bayonne, New Jersey. Bayonne, New Jersey: R. P. Whitcomb.
