= Hoboken Housing Authority =

Public housing agency in Hoboken, New Jersey

Agency overview
- Formed: May 3, 1949
- Jurisdiction: Hoboken, New Jersey
- Headquarters: 400 Harrison Street, Hoboken, New Jersey; 40.7435°N 74.041°W
- Agency executive: Marc A. Recko, Executive Director
- Website: www.myhhanj.com

The Hoboken Housing Authority (HHA) is the public housing agency in Hoboken, New Jersey responsible for providing and managing affordable housing for low-income residents of the city. It oversees public housing units, administers housing programs such as Section 8, and works on redevelopment planning for aging housing stock. It was established in 1949.

== History ==
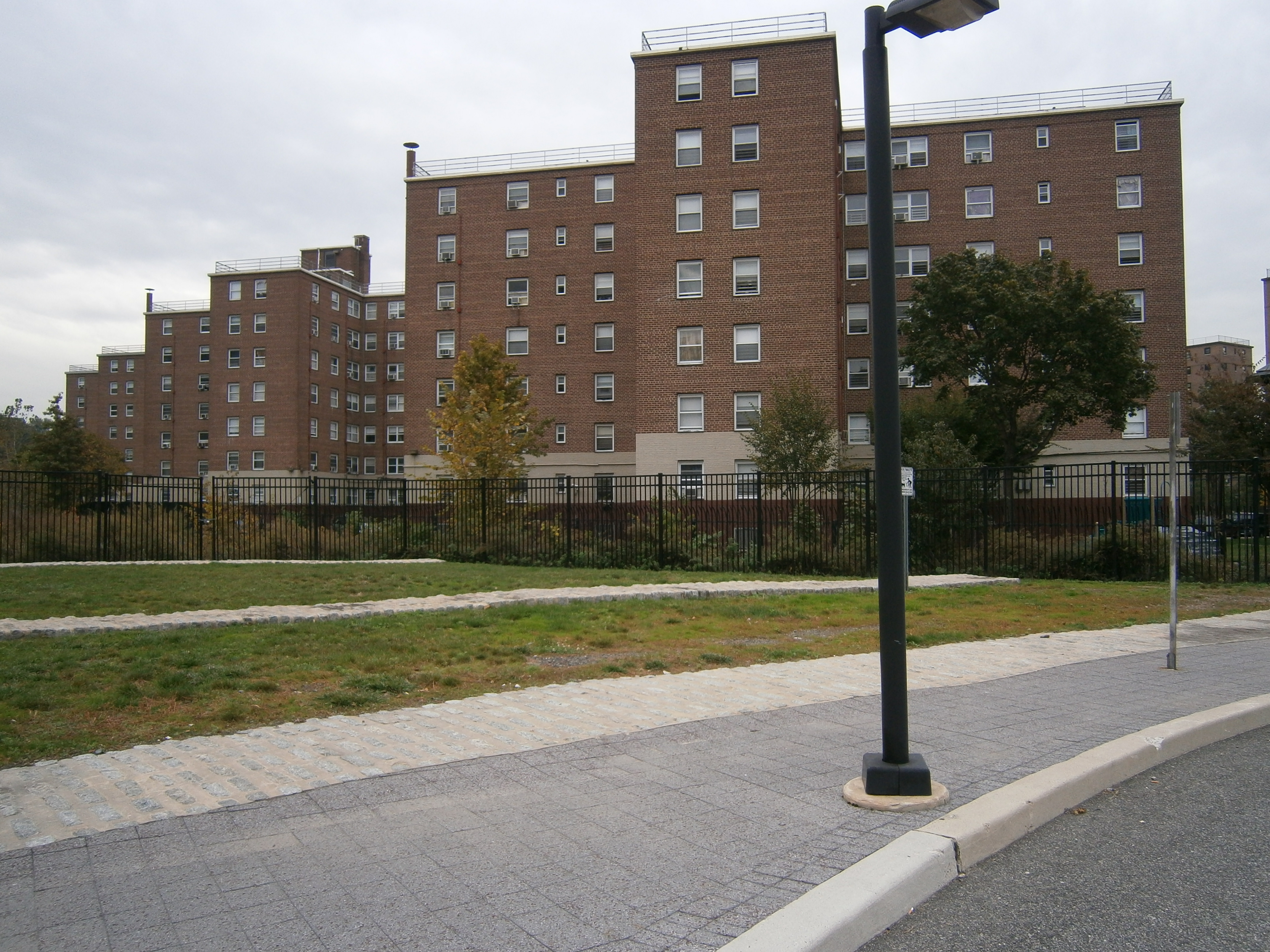
Andrew Jackson Gardens viewed from the 2nd Street station on the Hudson–Bergen Light Rail

The Hoboken Housing Authority (HHA) was established as the "Housing Authority of the City of Hoboken" on May 3, 1949. Construction of public housing by the HHA was financed through a grant from the Housing Act of 1949. The city met with officials from the Public Housing Administration (PHA) and requested a federal grant calling for the construction of more than 2,200 apartments. The first two sites were approved by the PHA in March 1950.

In July 1952, tenants began moving into the HHA's first development, Christopher Columbus Gardens. The public housing project officially opened on August 1, 1952, and was formally dedicated on October 11, 1952. The first units at the 14-acre (5.7 ha) Andrew Jackson Gardens housing complex were opened to tenants on October 1, 1952.

When Harrison Gardens to tenants in June 1961, the complex included special facilities for senior citizens. Monroe Gardens and Adams Gardens were opened for occupancy in October 1967 and November 1967, respectively, and both buildings were designed as apartments for senior citizens. Additional housing for senior citizens was added when the Fox Hill Gardens complex opened in August 1973.

In 2021, HHA secured funding to renovate the Fox Hill Gardens complex, converting the building to the United States Department of Housing and Urban Development's Rental Assistance Demonstration Program. In December 2023, the city approved a 10-year plan to rehabilitate or rebuild all six of its housing complexes (a total of 1,354 units) as well as to add additional affordable housing. In 2025, New Jersey reached a settlement with the City of Hoboken after a civil rights investigation found the city’s residency preference for affordable housing possibly discriminatory.

== List of developments ==
HHA Properties
1 Fox Hill Gardens
2 Christopher Columbus Gardens
3 Andrew Jackson Gardens
4 Harrison Gardens
5 Monroe Gardens
6 Adams Gardens

The HHA manages six housing complexes that are split into five Asset Management Projects (AMPs): (Note: Adams Gardens and Monroe Gardens are combined into the same AMP.)

HHA Property	Street Address	No.# of Buildings	No.# of Stories	No.# of Apartments	Year of Completion
Adams Gardens	220 Adams Street	1	10	125	1967
Andrew Jackson Gardens	208 Harrison Street	19	3 and 7	598	1953
Christopher Columbus Gardens	455 9th Street	2	7	97	1952
Fox Hill Gardens	311 13th Street	1	10	200	1973
Harrison Gardens	311 Harrison Street	4	10	209	1961
Monroe Gardens	221 Jackson Street	1	10	125	1967

The Andrew Jackson Gardens and Harrison Gardens complexes are collectively referred to as HHA's "Main Campus" and include over 800 apartments and encompass an area of about 16.5 acres (6.7 ha).

== See also ==
- Housing cooperative
