= Headroom LGBTQ+ Lounge =

Defunct gay bar in Jersey City, New Jersey, U.S.

- Logo

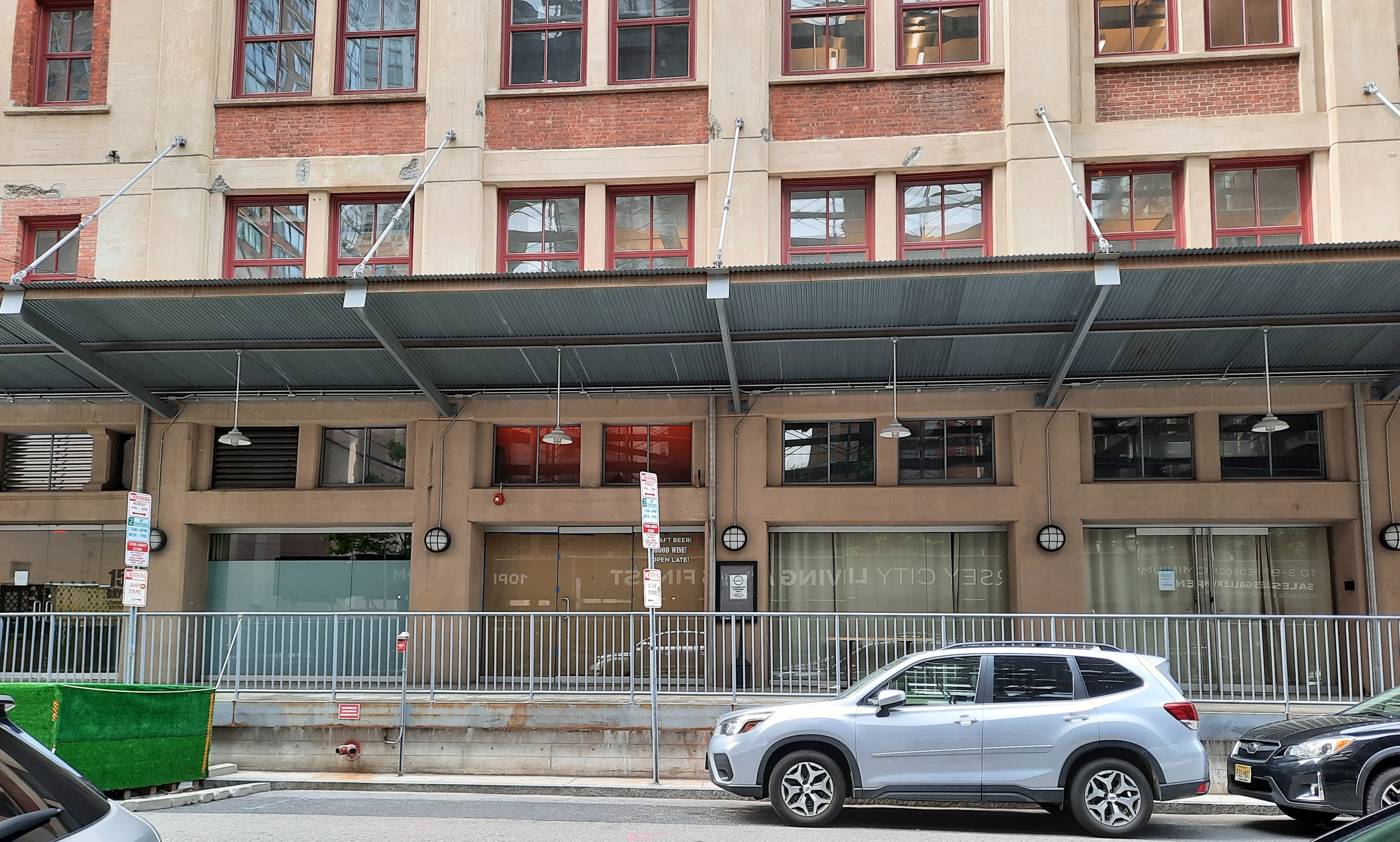
- Exterior of Headroom, with windows boarded and signage removed, in June 2021

- Location within Hudson County, New Jersey
- Address: 150 Bay Street
- Location: Jersey City, New Jersey, US
- Coordinates: 40.7208°N 74.0396°W
- Owner: Joseph Cameron; Howard Brunner
- Type: Gay bar
- Public transit: Grove Street station; Harsimus Cove station

Construction
- Opened: November 28, 2020
- Closed: May 26, 2021

Website
- headroomlounge.com

Headroom LGBTQ+ Lounge, also called simply Headroom, was a short-lived gay bar in Jersey City, New Jersey. It operated for six months, from November 2020 to May 2021. Though it was open only during the COVID-19 pandemic, the venue proved to be popular and offered an array of live entertainment, including drag shows, burlesque performances and RuPaul's Drag Race viewing parties. A contract dispute between the establishment's owners forced its abrupt closure days before the 2021 Memorial Day weekend. Critics praised the quality of Headroom's shows and noted its value as a safe space for the local LGBTQ community.

== Description ==
Located at 150 Bay Street in Jersey City, New Jersey, Headroom LGBTQ+ Lounge was co-owned by Joseph Cameron and Howard Brunner. During its period of operation, it was the only LGBTQ venue in the city with a dedicated performance stage. It hosted drag shows several nights a week, featuring both local artists and internationally known names from RuPaul's Drag Race. Weekend drag brunches and occasional burlesque events were also on offer. Once a month, the bar ran a show called "A Trans-elebration", which starred and celebrated transgender performers. When season 13 of Drag Race aired live, Headroom held viewing parties hosted by the season's fifth-place contestant, Olivia Lux.

== History ==
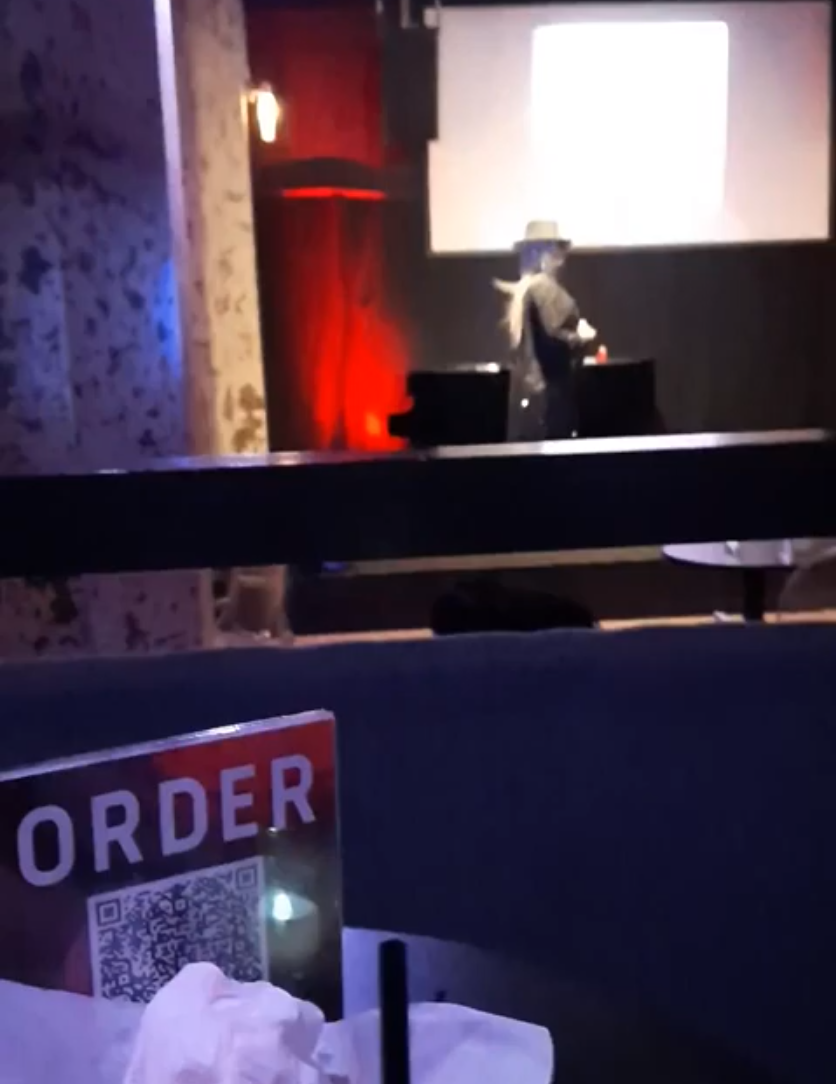
Table seating in Headroom's stage area included QR codes (bottom left) for contactless food and drink orders.

Brunner, the 150 Bay Street leaseholder, operated two businesses out of that address before Headroom LGBTQ+ Lounge. From June 2018 through the beginning of the COVID-19 pandemic, the establishment was Headroom Bar & Social, a neighborhood bar that featured live jazz performances, comedians and other artists. In July 2020, Brunner opened Homegrown, a bar located within the Headroom space that was known for serving locally brewed alcohol. At a Jersey City Pride event the following month, Brunner and Cameron entered into talks about converting the space into an LGBT-focused establishment. Cameron's intentions, he stated in interviews with Instinct and NJ.com, were to create a safe space and job opportunities for the LGBT community. On November 28, 2020, the venue reopened its doors as Headroom LGBTQ+ Lounge. About running a bar during the pandemic, Cameron said:

[O]ne way we had an advantage with that over other businesses is that ... this is all we ever knew. A lot of other businesses were trying to fit a square into a circle—trying to scale back and do things of that nature, but we just started out ... so it was all that we ever knew. We were able to set everything up properly from the getgo, and it was actually not that bad.

Among other precautions, the bar conducted temperature checks and contact tracing, and all of its tables were spaced 6 feet (1.8 m) apart. Patrons were required to remain masked, and performers were tested for COVID-19 before their shows. Food and drink orders could be placed contact-free.

=== Closure ===
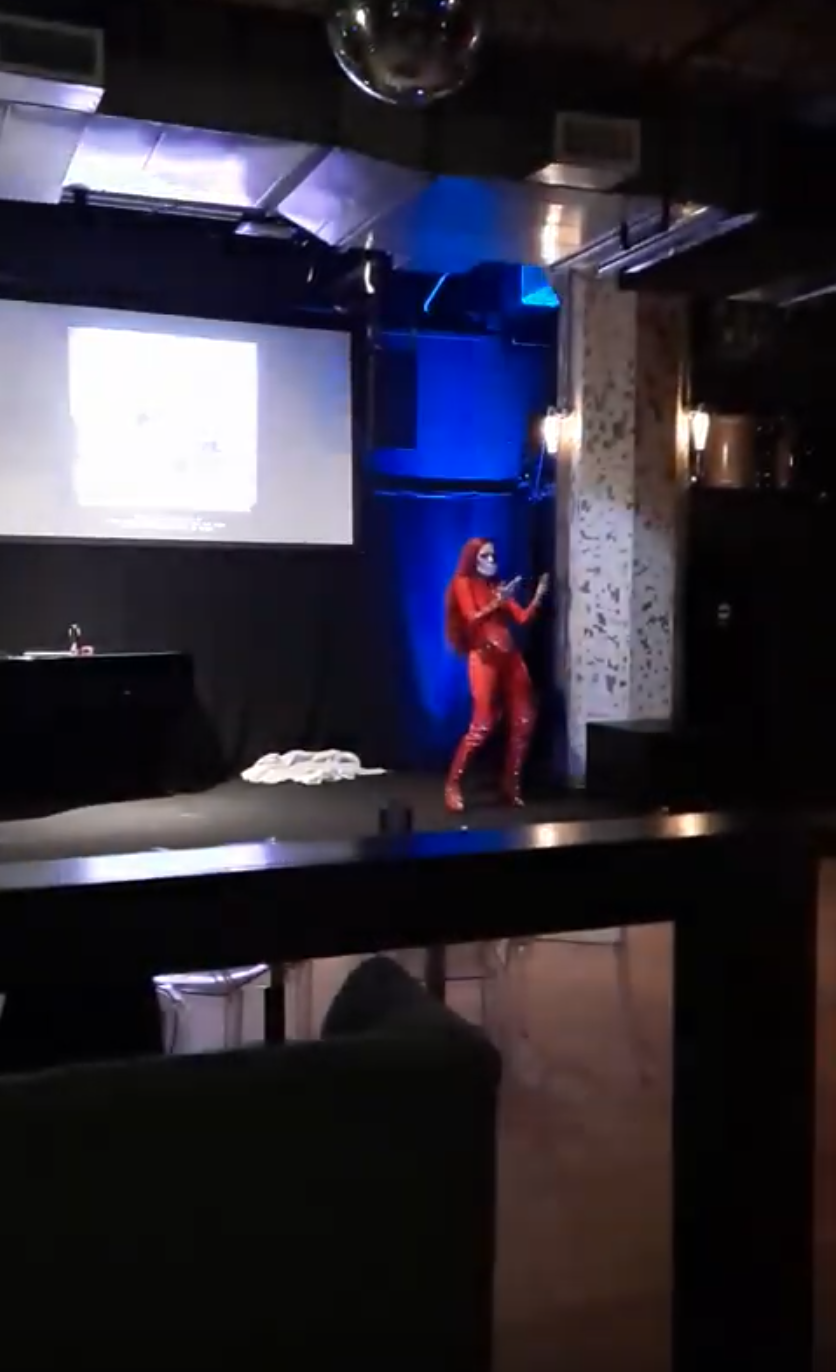
Drag show at Headroom in 2021

Jersey City Pride held its annual launch party at Headroom in early May 2021. Ahead of Memorial Day weekend, when New Jersey's mandate on indoor mask use and other pandemic restrictions were set to expire, the bar promoted a number of high-profile events, including performances by Shuga Cain and Nicky Doll. It also advertised its first dance parties, which had not previously been allowed due to social distancing requirements.

On the evening of May 26, Cameron went live on the club's Instagram profile to announce that he and Brunner had had a dispute that resulted in Headroom's immediate and permanent closure. According to Cameron, the pair's contract contained a provision that entertainment fees collected at the door were payable only to the venue's entertainers and entertainment coordinator. Brunner, he said, approached him about taking a cut of the upcoming weekend's fees for himself. He told Brunner that he would not modify their existing agreement without involving his lawyer, and Brunner retaliated by changing the venue's locks and sending Cameron an e-mail ending their partnership. Cameron stated that their contract required either party to give the other 21 days' notice before severing their business relationship, and he indicated that he was looking into the matter with his lawyer. Nevertheless, the bar remained shuttered, and all upcoming performances were cancelled.

Brunner made his first statement to the press the following week, when he told NJ Advance Media that Headroom's closure resulted from "irreconcilable differences [between him and Cameron] as to how to grow the business post-COVID". The Record quoted him saying: "Contrary to Mr. Cameron's depiction, it had nothing to do with the performers' rightful income." Brunner also expressed dismay that "a business decision has been portrayed as an attack on [the LGBT] community", referring to public comments by Cameron, who planned a public shaming rally against Brunner for "mistreatment of [the] LGBTQ+ community".

A number of downtown Jersey City businesses extended support to Cameron and Headroom, some offering work to the venue's abruptly jobless employees. Headroom's entertainment coordinator, who performed in drag there as Anida Tension, started a GoFundMe page to raise money for staff. Cameron stated that he was searching for a new location to reopen Headroom, though he was not sure this would be possible in Jersey City. He indicated that he was in talks with venues in Asbury Park, Hell's Kitchen and Lyndhurst.

== Reception ==
Michael Cook of Instinct characterized Headroom as "a safe, entertaining and thriving space to discover some amazing talent and the continuously emerging Jersey City LGBTQ community". In a statement to NJ.com, Nicky Doll described the bar as "a safe space for people during COVID, a place for warmth and reassurance". The Record's Rebecca King said: "In the few months it was open, it became a well-loved space, especially by the LGBTQ+ community. It was one of the only places in North Jersey to see a drag or burlesque show." David Menzies of NJ.com wrote that "there was nothing else like it around".

== See also ==
- COVID-19 pandemic in New Jersey
