= Newport Centre (shopping mall) =

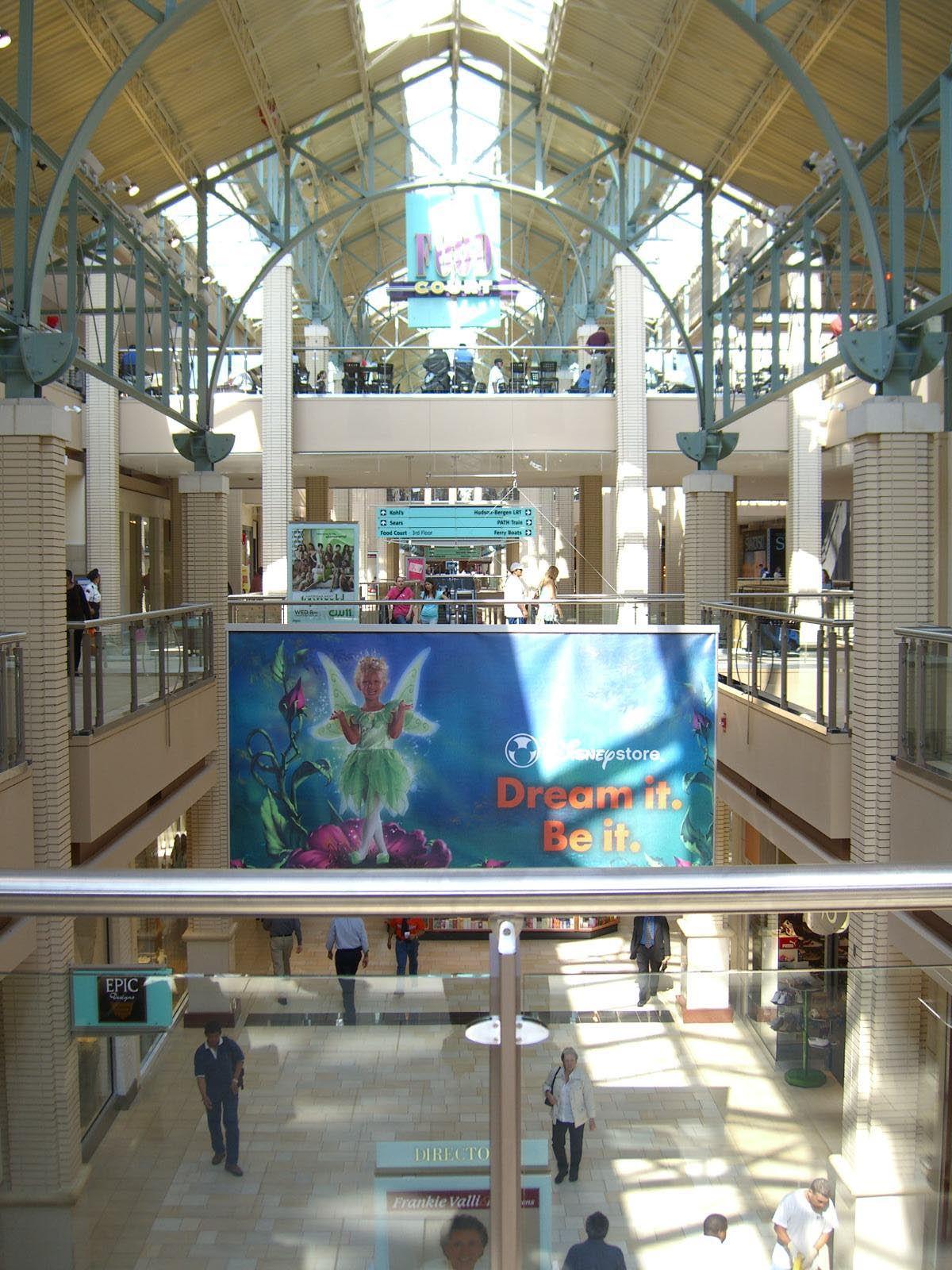
- Location: 30 Mall Dr W Jersey City, New Jersey, 07310 United States
- Coordinates: 40°43′37″N 74°2′16″W
- Opened: October 1987
- Developer: Melvin Simon & Associates
- Manager: Simon Property Group
- Owner: LeFrak Organization and Simon Property Group
- Floor area: 1,152,599 sq ft (107,080 m^{2})
- Floors: 2 (plus third floor food court)
- Public transit: Newport station (PATH); Pavonia/Newport (HBLR station); NJ Transit bus: 9, 16, 63, 64, 68, 86, 126

Newport Centre, commonly known as Newport Mall, is a shopping mall in Jersey City, New Jersey, that opened in 1987. It is a major component of the enormous Newport, Jersey City, a mixed-use community on the Hudson River waterfront across from Lower Manhattan. One of eleven shopping malls in New Jersey managed by Simon Property Group, it is located at 30 Mall Drive West, and is bound by Henderson Street on the west, Mall Drive East on the east, 6th Street on the south, and Newport Parkway on the north. The mall has a gross leasable area of 1,152,599 sq ft (107,080 m^{2}).

The anchor stores are AMC Theatres, JCPenney, Macy's, Primark, Kohl's, and Dick's House of Sport.

== Stores ==
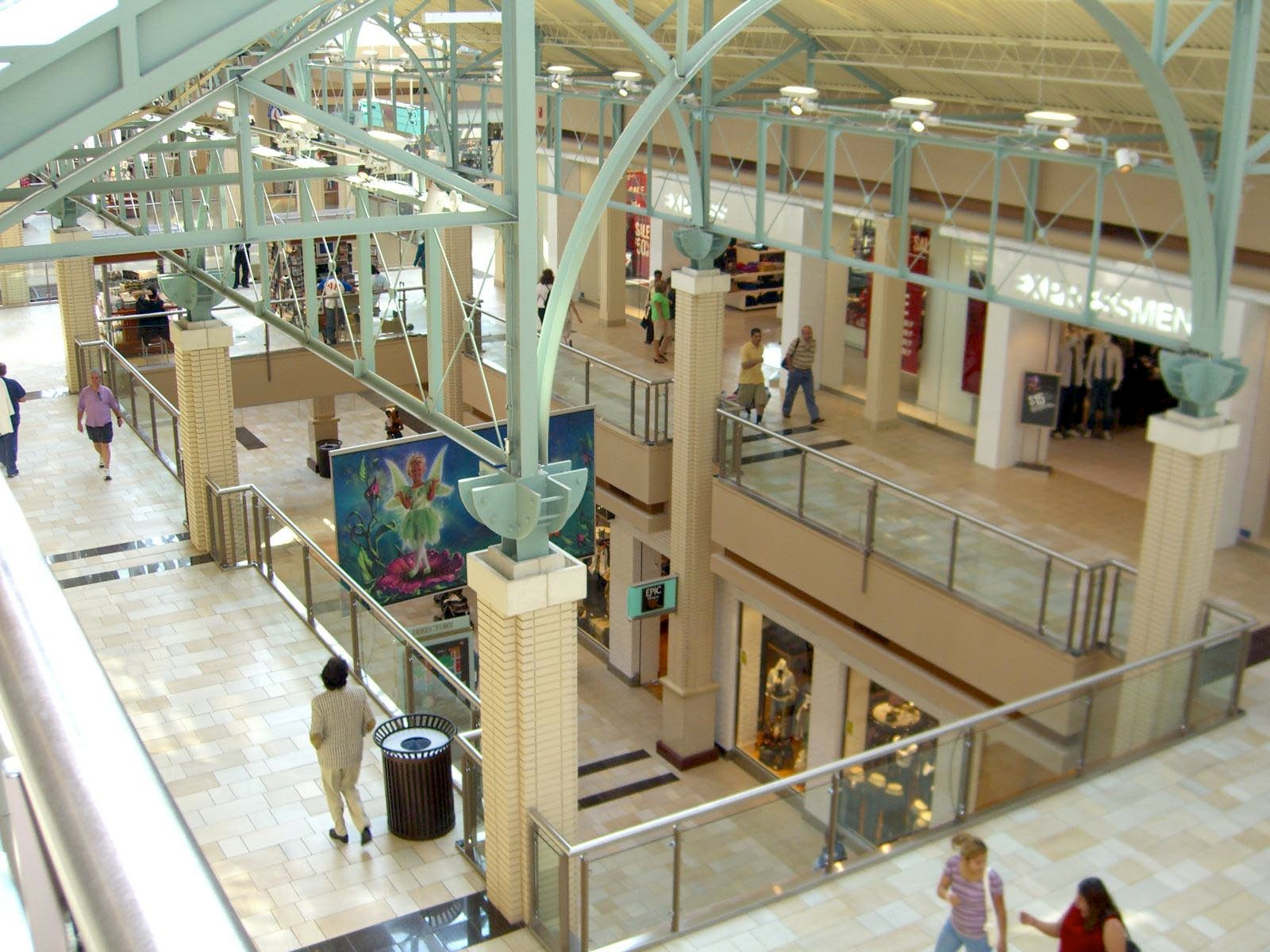
View from the third floor of Newport Centre

The mall partially opened to the public on October 14, 1987, with Sears and Stern's as two of the four anchors operating. It was already known that the third major tenant would be a JCPenney store, and the fourth anchor was not announced.

The mall's official opening was on November 11, 1987, attended by New Jersey Governor Thomas Kean and Senator Frank Lautenberg. On that date, the mall contained 75 tenants, featuring the two aforementioned anchor stores, Sam Goody, Benetton, Eddie Bauer, and Hallmark. The 1,200,000-square-foot (110,000 m^{2}) was intended to draw residents from the new Newport waterfront development and the surrounding area, as well as shoppers from Bergen County, where blue laws keep shopping malls closed on Sundays.

JCPenney opened on October 4, 1989, with the fourth anchor still unknown. The shopping mall continued to have only three anchors well into the 1990s.

In 2001, Federated Department Stores closed its Stern's division, and the Newport Centre location was re-branded as Macy's. The mall was originally planning on building the current Macy's as a new anchor alongside Stern's, Sears, and JCPenney instead of using the converted store. The plan went on, and the new store opened on November 6, 2002, moving in the 300 employees of the ex-Sterns/Macy's building. In December 2005, it was announced that Kohl's would occupy the old Stern's building. Kohl's opened on October 1, 2006.

On March 16, 2020, Jersey City Mayor Steve Fulop ordered the Newport Centre to be closed due to the COVID-19 pandemic. The next day, New Jersey Governor Phil Murphy backed this temporary closure and ordered all malls in New Jersey to temporarily close as well. It reopened on June 29, 2020.

On January 5, 2024, it was announced that Sears, the last location in the state, would be closing at the mall in Spring 2024. Dick's House of Sport and Primark were set to open into the vacant Sears space. Primark officially opened on August 14, 2025, on the first floor. Dick's House of Sport opened a month later.

There are three floors to the mall complex. The mall is part of the Newport Complex, which includes the Newport Tower, the sixth tallest building in Jersey City. Both it and the Hudson Mall are in an "Urban Enterprise Zone", reducing the state sales tax on purchases from 6.625% to 3.3125% at eligible merchants (with no sales tax on clothing).

The mall is anchored by JCPenney, Kohl's, Macy's, Primark, Dick’s House of Sport, and AMC Theatres.

== Transportation ==
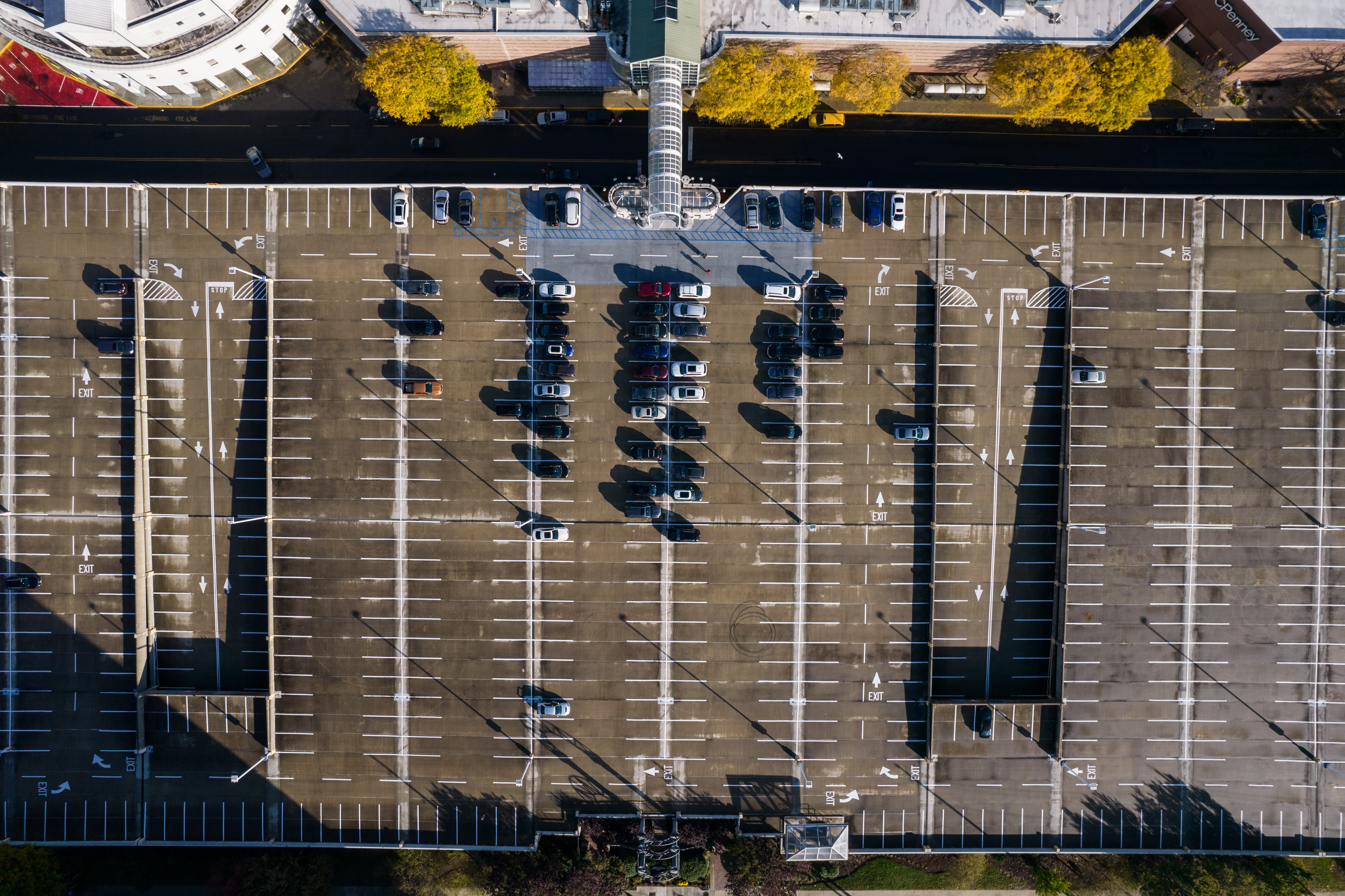
Three-story parking structure (including the rooftop)

The mall can be reached via the Hudson–Bergen Light Rail's Pavonia/Newport station and the PATH's Newport station. It is also served by New Jersey Transit buses and is the terminus for routes from Jersey City Heights and the North Hudson towns of Guttenberg, North Bergen, West New York, and Union City.
