= Newport station (Hudson–Bergen Light Rail) =

Light rail station in Jersey City, New Jersey

Newport
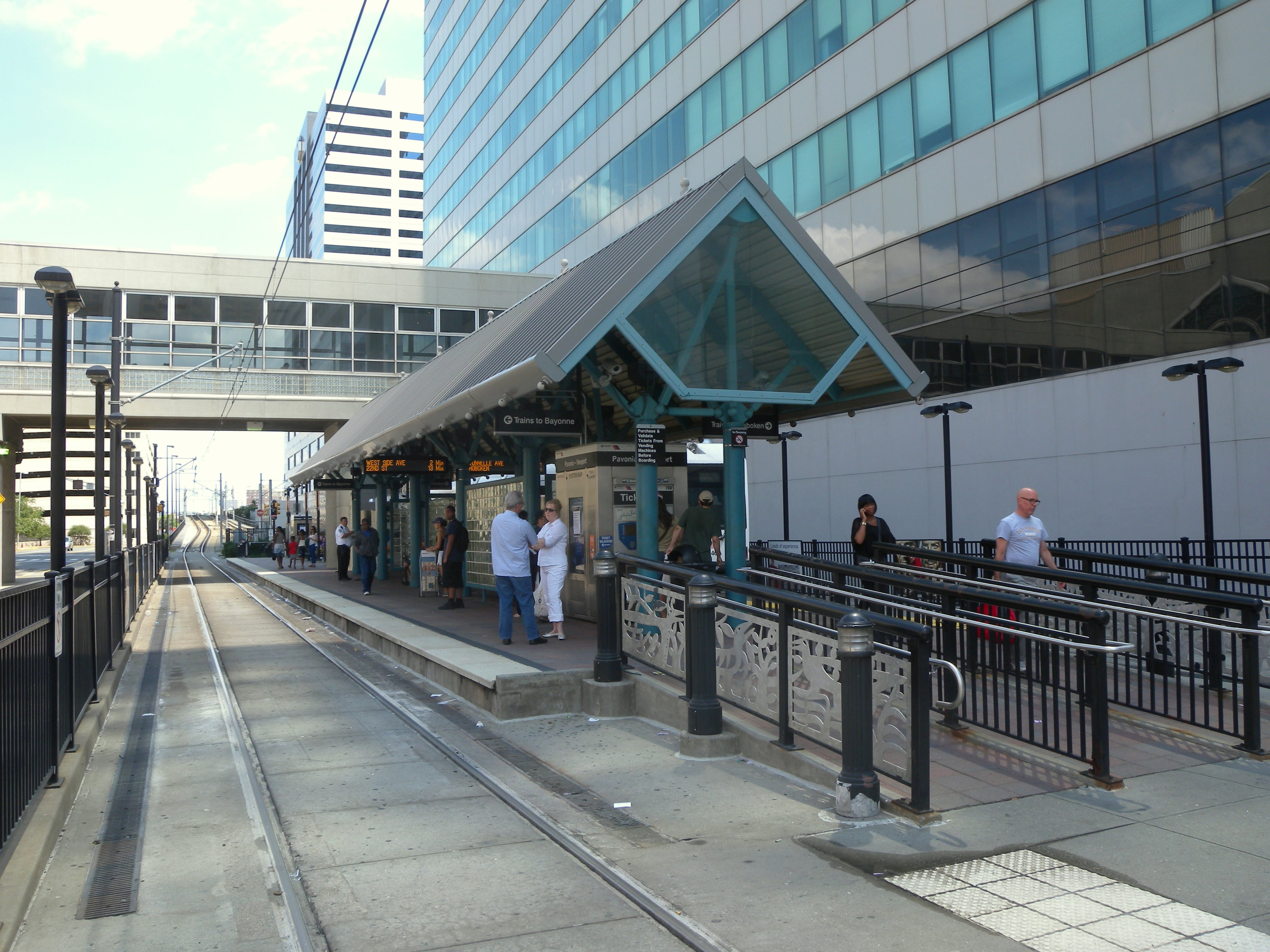
- Newport station platform

General information
- Location: Mall Drive East; Jersey City, New Jersey
- Coordinates: 40°43′36″N 74°02′10″W
- Owner: New Jersey Transit
- Platforms: 1 island platform
- Tracks: 2
- Connections: NJ Transit Bus: 9, 16, 63, 64, 68, 86, 126; Academy Bus; PATH at Newport

Construction
- Cycle facilities: Yes
- Accessible: Yes

Other information
- Station code: 30830
- Fare zone: 1

History
- Opened: November 18, 2000
- Former names: Pavonia/Newport (2000–2012)

Passengers
- 2025: 5,666 (average weekday)
- Rank: 2 of 24

Services
Preceding station	NJ Transit	Following station
Harsimus Cove toward West Side Avenue	West Side–Tonnelle	2nd Street toward Tonnelle Avenue
Harsimus Cove toward 8th Street	Bayonne–Hoboken	Hoboken Terminus
Harborside toward 8th Street	Bayonne Flyer	Hoboken Terminus
Location

Newport station is a station of the Hudson–Bergen Light Rail in Jersey City, New Jersey. Located on Mall Drive East near the Newport Centre shopping mall, the station services trains operating between Hoboken Terminal and Tonnelle Avenue station in North Bergen to West Side Avenue in Jersey City and 8th Street station in Bayonne. The station is also a stop on the Bayonne Flyer, an express service on the light rail. Newport station also serves as a transfer to the PATH line between Newark Penn Station, Hoboken Terminal and the 33rd Street and World Trade Center stations in New York City at its Newport station. The station consists of a single island platform to service two tracks. As of 2014, it is the busiest station on the HBLR system (with an average of 6,122 passenger boardings daily).

The station opened on November 18, 2000 as part of an extension of the original operating segment of the Hudson–Bergen Light Rail. At the time of opening, the Hudson–Bergen Light Rail and PATH stations were both known as Pavonia/Newport. However, both were changed to Newport in the early 2010s. In January 2019, it was announced that connecting New York Waterway ferry service would be restored in the summer of 2019 at a new rebuilt pier. Ferry service was previously discontinued in January 2014 due to deteriorating pier conditions. The Hudson River Waterfront Walkway to Hoboken Terminal also had been recently completed allowing access to the ferry services at the terminal from Newport.

== Gallery ==
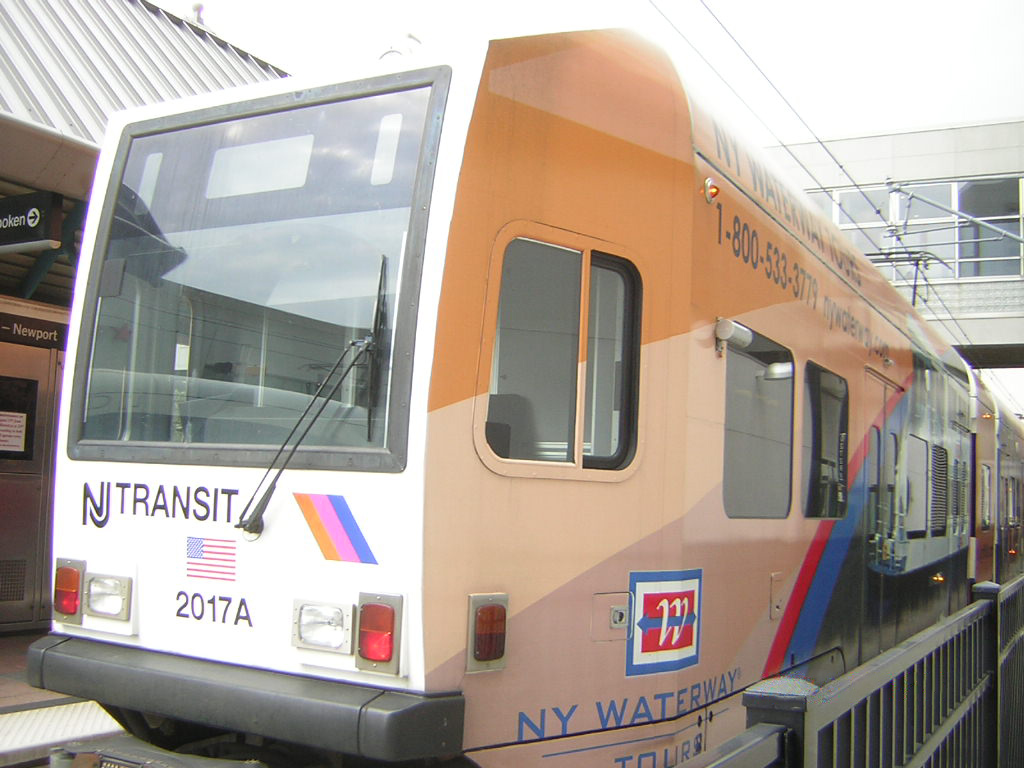
HBLR 2017A (sporting a NY Waterway ad) en route to Bayonne

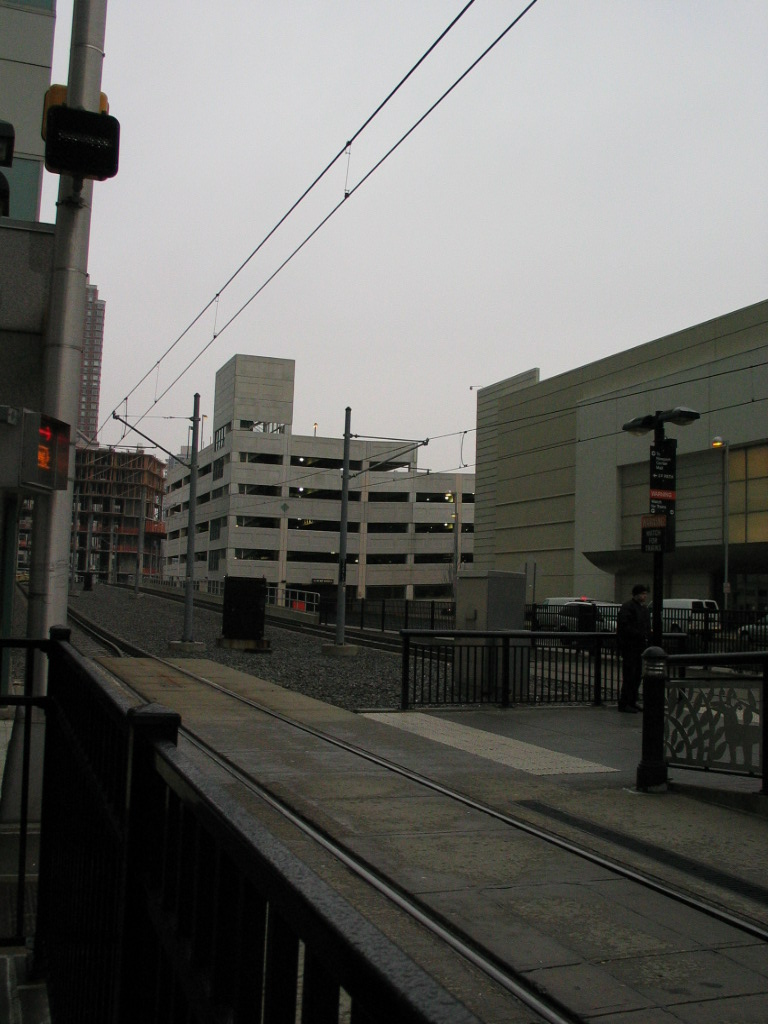
Trackside view of Newport Centre Mall parking garage

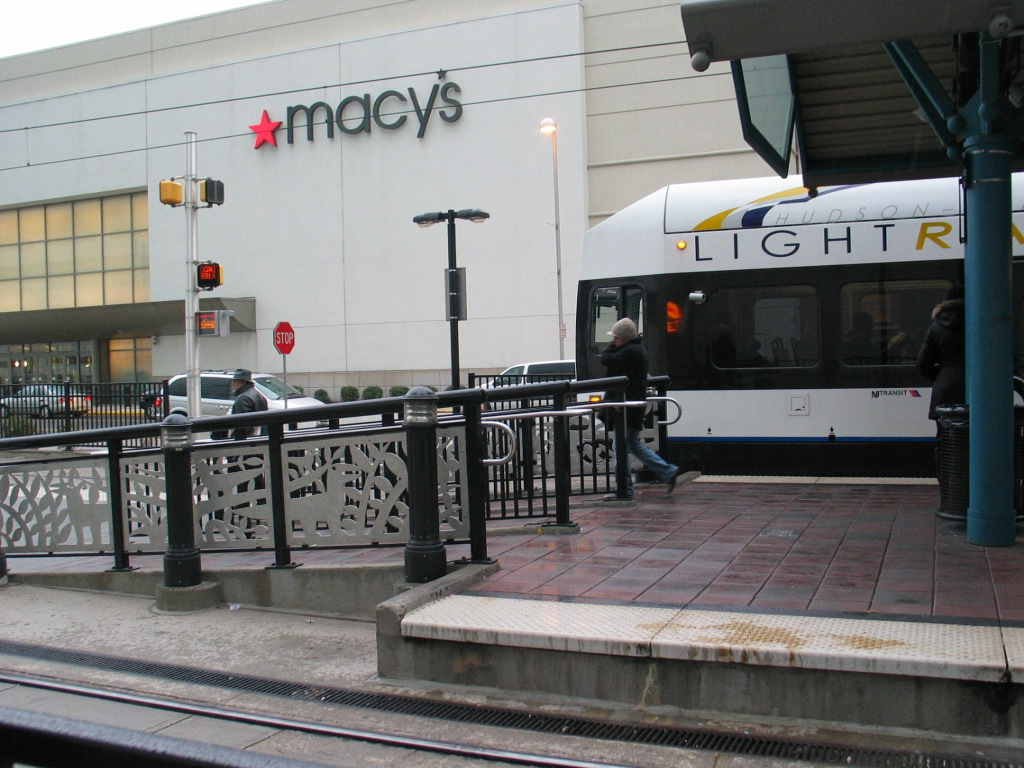
A train at Newport station in January 2007

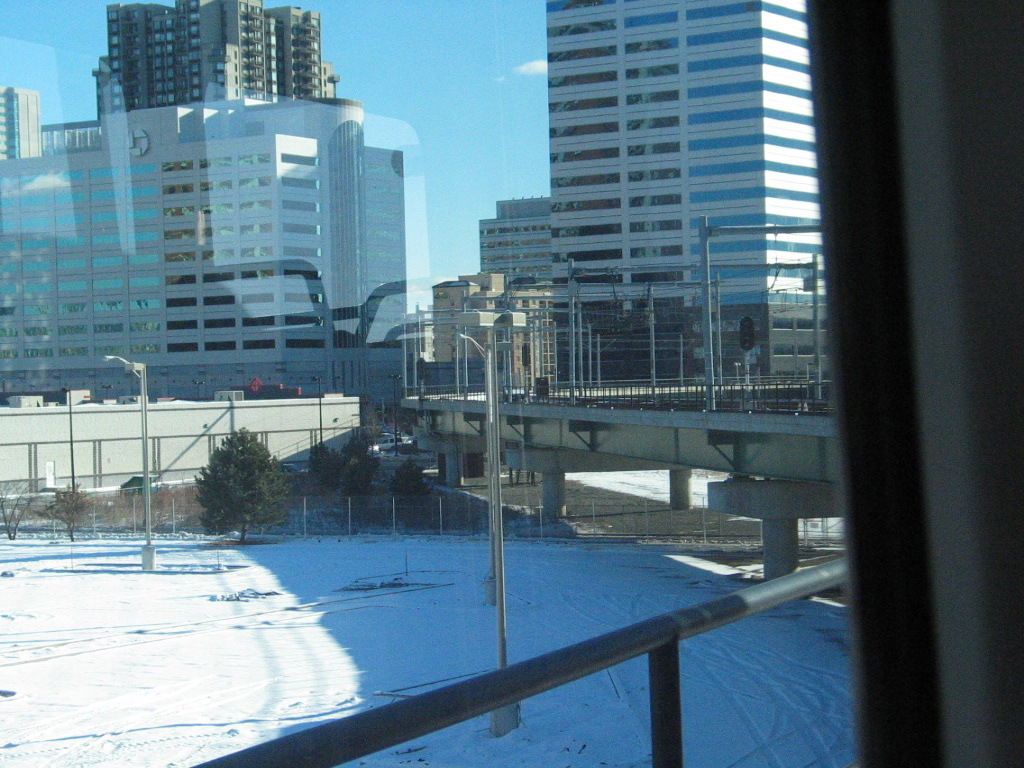
Elevated rail bridge, north of station
