= 9th Street–Congress Street station =

Station on the Hudson–Bergen Light Rail (HBLR) in Hoboken, New Jersey

Ninth Street / Congress Street
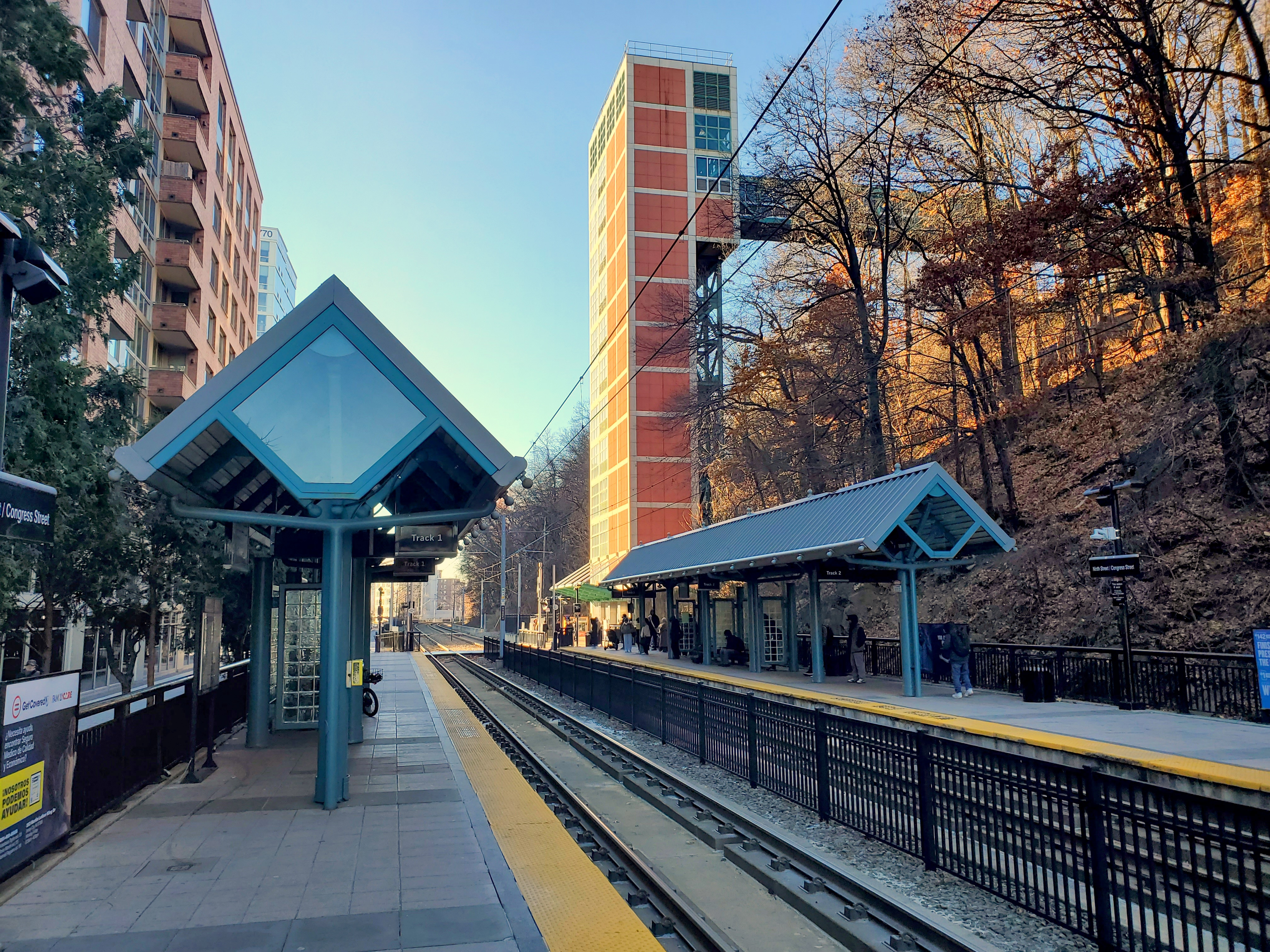
- 9th Street–Congress Street station in 2024.

General information
- Location: 700 Eighth Street; Hoboken, New Jersey
- Coordinates: 40°44′55″N 74°02′19″W
- Owner: New Jersey Transit
- Platforms: 2 side platforms
- Tracks: 2
- Connections: NJ Transit Bus: 10, 22, 84, 85, 86, 87, 89, 119, 123

Construction
- Cycle facilities: Yes
- Accessible: Yes

Other information
- Fare zone: 1

History
- Opened: September 7, 2004

Passengers
- 2025: 2,870 (average weekday)
- Rank: 6 of 24

Services
Preceding station	NJ Transit	Following station
2nd Street toward West Side Avenue	West Side–Tonnelle	Lincoln Harbor toward Tonnelle Avenue
2nd Street toward Hoboken	Hoboken–Tonnelle	Lincoln Harbor toward Tonnelle Avenue
Location

9th Street–Congress Street station is a station on the Hudson–Bergen Light Rail (HBLR) operated by New Jersey Transit which opened on September 7, 2004. Located at Ninth Street, west of Jackson Street, in Hoboken, New Jersey, the station also serves the Heights of Jersey City. There are two tracks and two side platforms.

== Elevator ==
9th Street–Congress Street station is notable for having a pair of elevators that runs along the face of the Palisades cliffs between the platforms at their base and Paterson Plank Road at their crest. Use of the elevators is free. Before its construction, travel between Jersey City Heights and Hoboken was along Paterson Plank Road, Mountain Road, 14th Street Viaduct or paths along the cliffs now made inaccessible by fencing along the right of way.
