= Harborside station =

Harborside
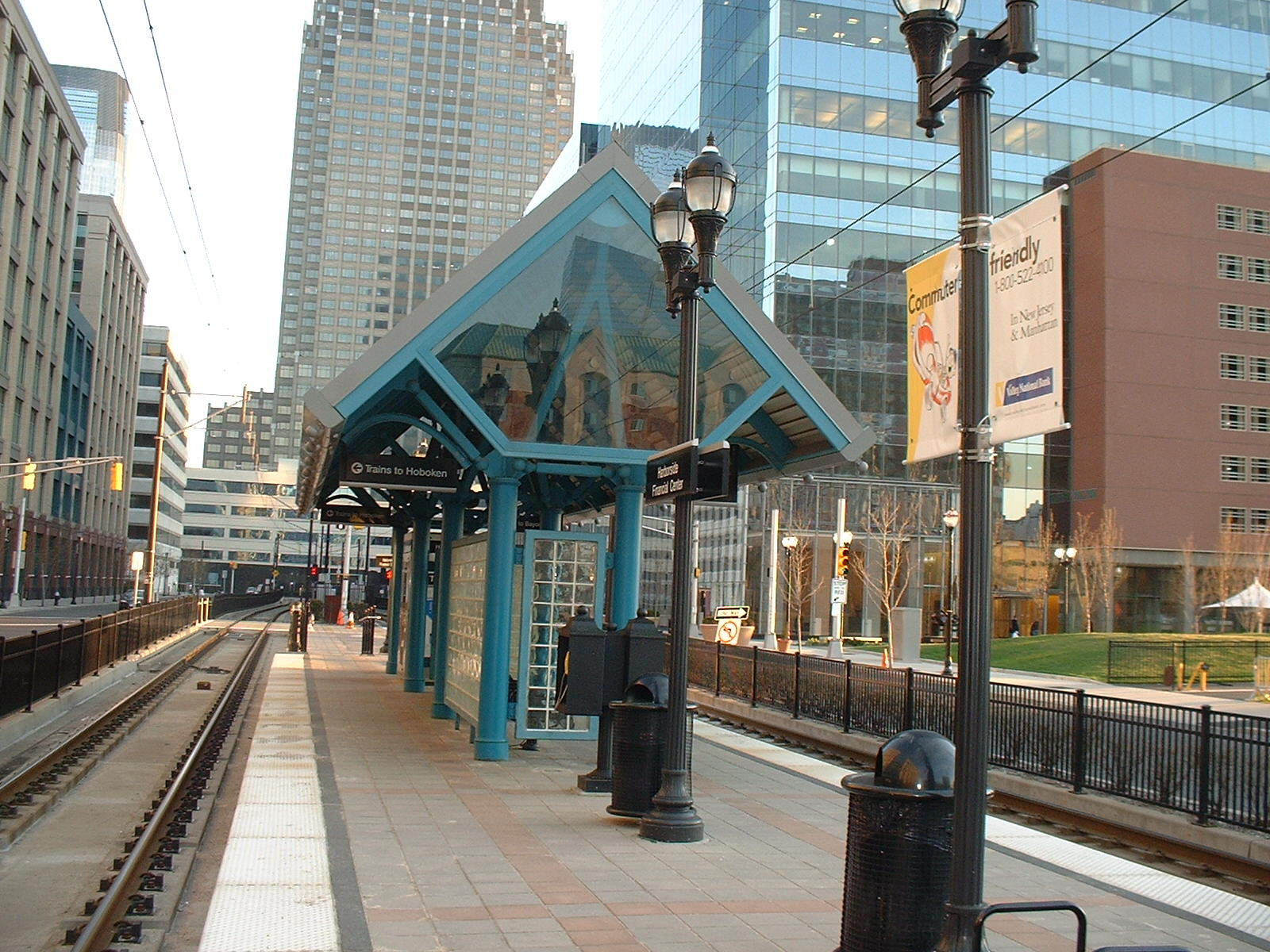
- Harborside station platform in April 2005

General information
- Location: Hudson Street at Bay Street and Harborside Place; Jersey City, New Jersey
- Coordinates: 40°43′10″N 74°02′02″W
- Owner: New Jersey Transit
- Platforms: 1 island platform
- Tracks: 2
- Connections: NY Waterway

Construction
- Cycle facilities: Yes
- Accessible: Yes

Other information
- Fare zone: 1

History
- Opened: November 18, 2000
- Former names: Harborside Financial Center (2000–2014)

Passengers
- 2025: 1,516 (average weekday)
- Rank: 15 of 24

Services
Preceding station	NJ Transit	Following station
Exchange Place toward West Side Avenue	West Side–Tonnelle	Harsimus Cove toward Tonnelle Avenue
Exchange Place toward 8th Street	Bayonne–Hoboken	Harsimus Cove toward Hoboken
Exchange Place toward 8th Street	Bayonne Flyer	Newport toward Hoboken
Location

Harborside station (formerly named Harborside Financial Center station) is a station on the Hudson–Bergen Light Rail (HBLR) located east of Greene Street, between Morgan and Steuben Streets, in Exchange Place section of Jersey City, New Jersey and named for the adjacent Harborside office complex. There are two tracks and an island platform.

The station opened on November 18, 2000, and is served by the West Side–Tonnelle and 8th Street–Hoboken lines at all times and the Bayonne Flyer during the weekday rush.

In October 2017, New York Waterway initiated connecting ferry service at Harborside Financial Center.

== Gallery ==
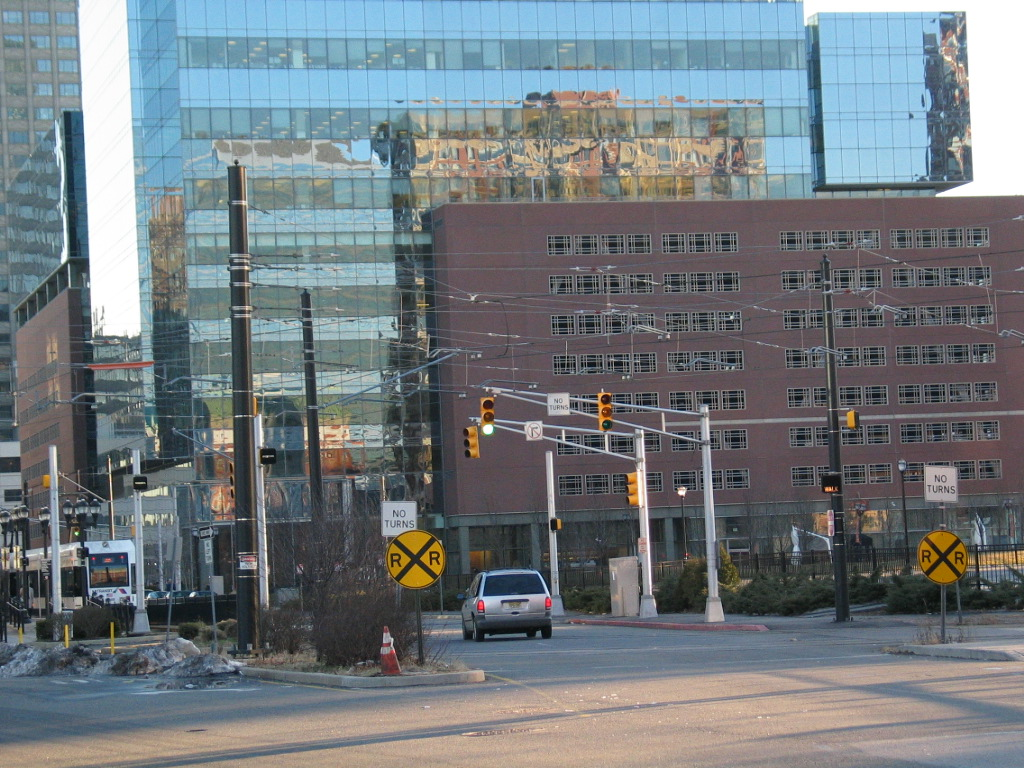
Hudson Street divides before Harborside station. HFC Plaza 5 is in the background.

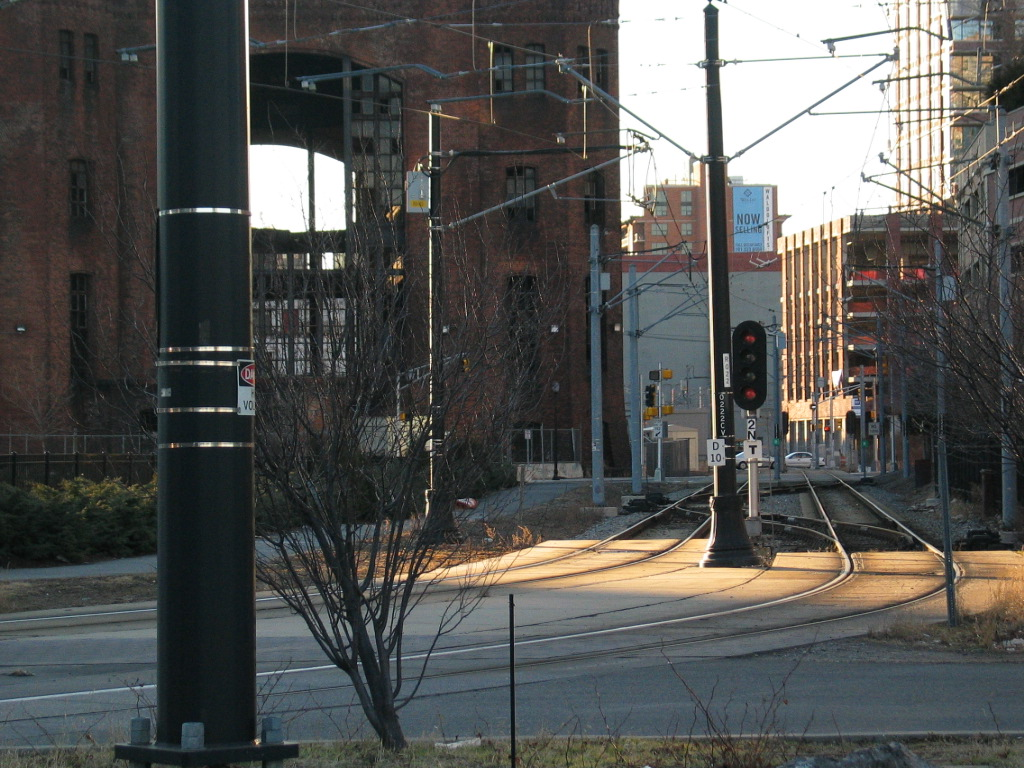
North side of the stop, across from Hudson Street & Harborside Place
