= Harsimus Cove station =

Harsimus Cove
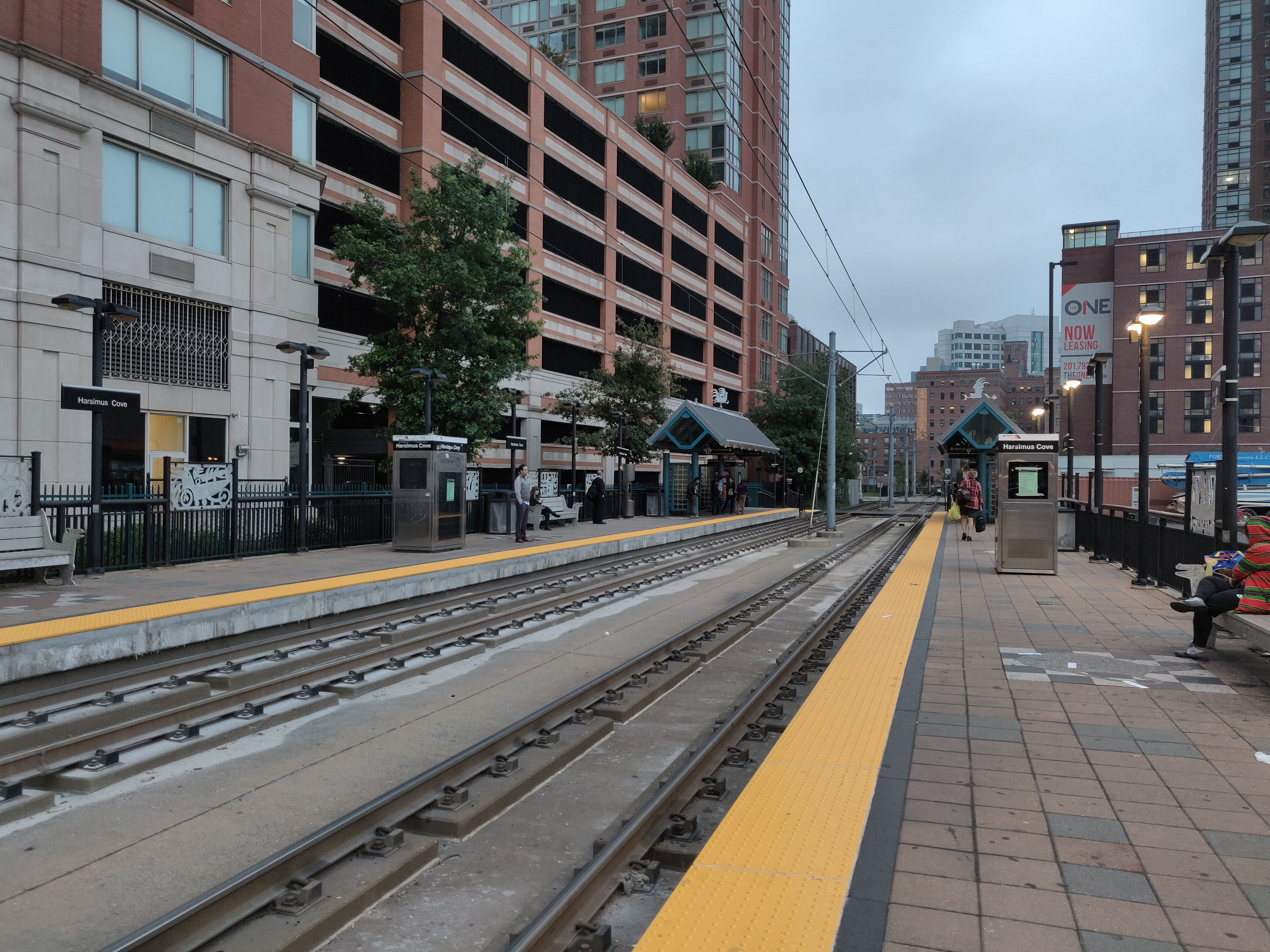
- Harsimus Cove station platforms

General information
- Location: Metro Plaza Drive; Jersey City, New Jersey
- Coordinates: 40°43′21″N 74°02′14″W
- Owner: New Jersey Transit
- Platforms: 2 side platforms
- Tracks: 2

Construction
- Cycle facilities: Yes
- Accessible: Yes

Other information
- Station code: 30831
- Fare zone: 1

History
- Opened: November 18, 2000

Passengers
- 2025: 1,757 (average weekday)
- Rank: 10 of 24

Services
Preceding station	NJ Transit	Following station
Harborside toward West Side Avenue	West Side–Tonnelle	Newport toward Tonnelle Avenue
Harborside toward 8th Street	Bayonne–Hoboken	Newport toward Hoboken
Bayonne Flyer does not stop here
Location

Harsimus Cove station is a station the Hudson–Bergen Light Rail (HBLR) located at Metro Plaza Drive in the Harsimus Section of downtown Jersey City, New Jersey. It is served by the 8th Street–Hoboken and West Side Avenue–Tonnelle Avenue branches.

The station opened on November 18, 2000. There are two tracks and two side platforms, each with a canopy. It is located on a private right-of-way with 4th Street to the north and 2nd Street to the south.

== Image gallery ==
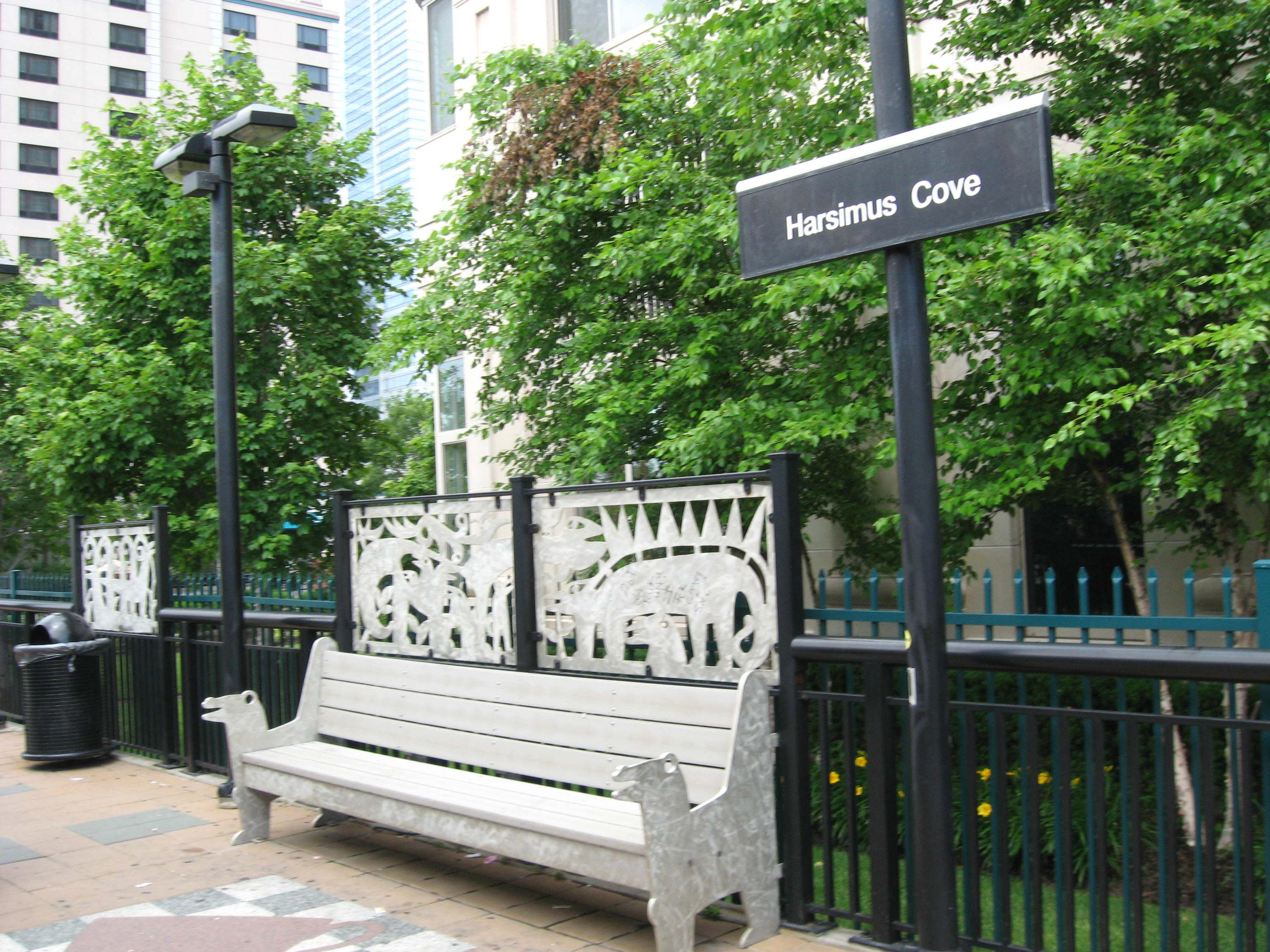
A bench on the northbound platform.

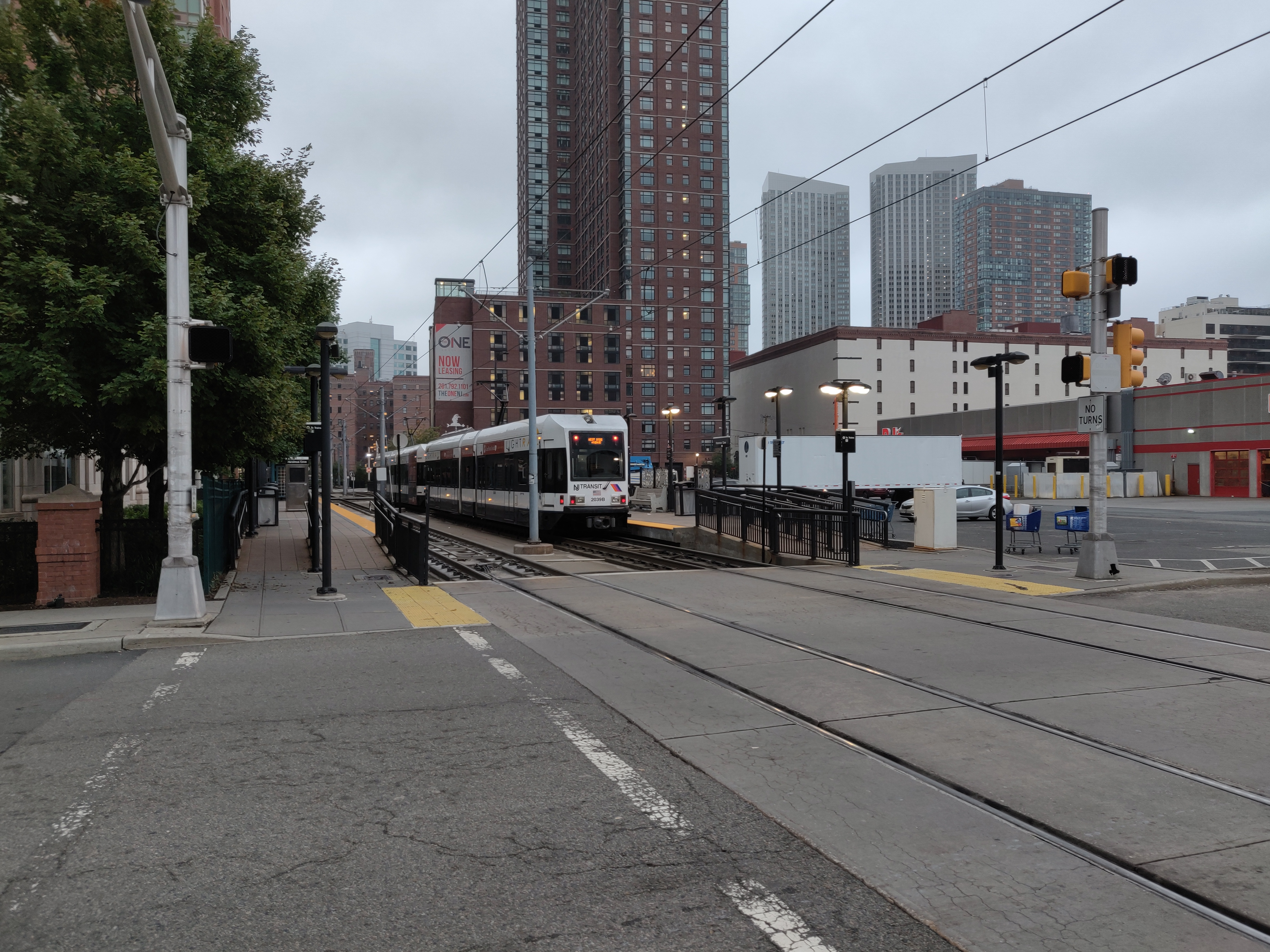
The rail crossing north of the station on 4th Street.

== See also ==
- Harsimus Branch
- Horseshoe, Jersey City
