= 2nd Street station (Hudson–Bergen Light Rail) =

Tram stop in Hoboken, New Jersey

Second Street
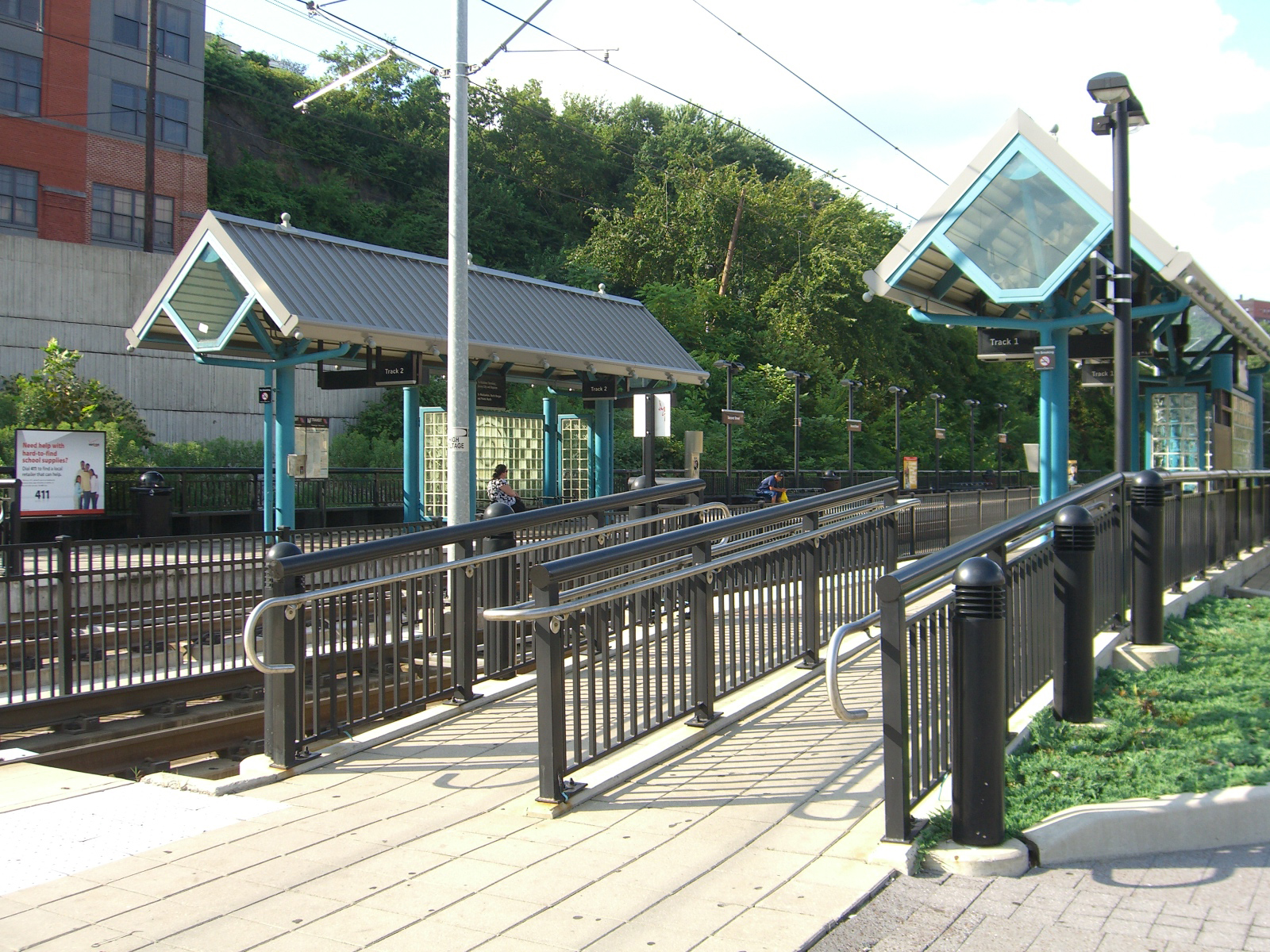
- 2nd Street station platforms in August 2009

General information
- Location: 204 Marshall Street; Hoboken, New Jersey
- Coordinates: 40°44′30″N 74°02′34″W
- Owner: New Jersey Transit
- Platforms: 2 side platforms
- Tracks: 2
- Connections: NJ Transit Bus: 85, 87, 89

Construction
- Cycle facilities: Yes
- Accessible: Yes

Other information
- Fare zone: 1

History
- Opened: September 7, 2004

Passengers
- 2025: 1,551(average weekday)
- Rank: 14 of 24

Services
Preceding station	NJ Transit	Following station
Newport toward West Side Avenue	West Side–Tonnelle	9th Street–Congress Street toward Tonnelle Avenue
Hoboken Terminus	Hoboken–Tonnelle	9th Street–Congress Street toward Tonnelle Avenue
Location

2nd Street station is a station on the Hudson–Bergen Light Rail (HBLR) located west of Marshall Street near the foot of Paterson Plank Road in Hoboken, New Jersey. There are two tracks and two side platforms.

== History ==
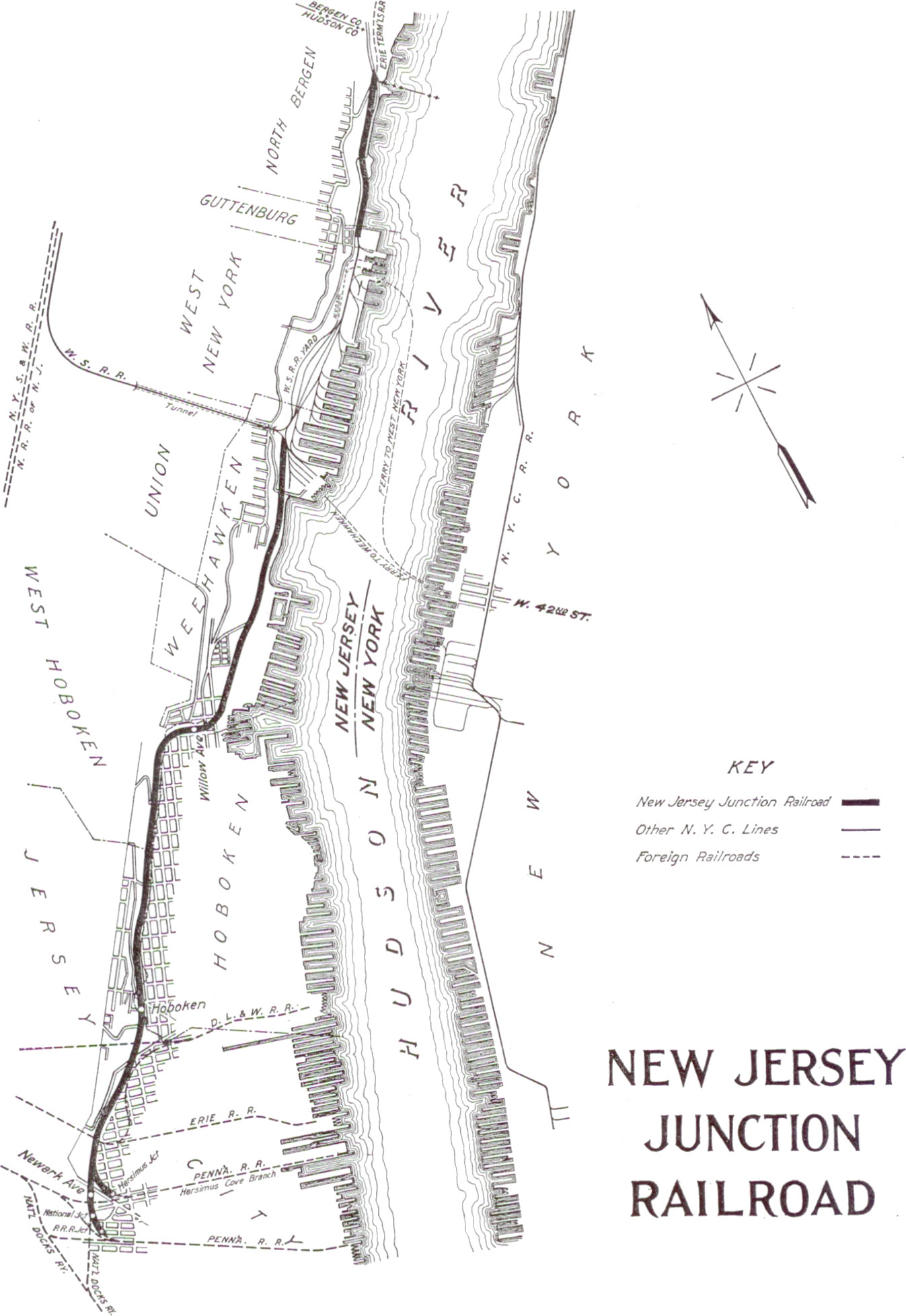
The right of way originally part of New Jersey Junction Railroad

The station opened on September 7, 2004. The right of way on which it is situated was originally part of the New York Central New Jersey Junction Railroad, which maintained a station there. It was later used by the Penn Central River Division and the Conrail River Line before being abandoned to make way for the current system. The station is located at the foot of the Hudson Palisades. In 2003, Jersey City agreed with a developer of a nearby factory-to-housing conversion to cover the cost of an outdoor public stairway from Jersey City Heights to the station. The stairway was never built and in June 2011 the city took responsibility for the project. The steel steps were opened in November 2013.

== Station art ==
Station art was installed at the same time that the station opened. A Planetary Park features nine planets depicted in their relative scale and position to the sun. Artist John Van Alstine constructed the Sun and a functioning sundial. Grace Graupe-Pillard fabricated the nine fiberglass planets with painted steel figurative attachments, as a metaphor for the celebration of the individual and his/her connection to the world.
