= Hudson–Bergen Light Rail =

Light rail system in New Jersey, US

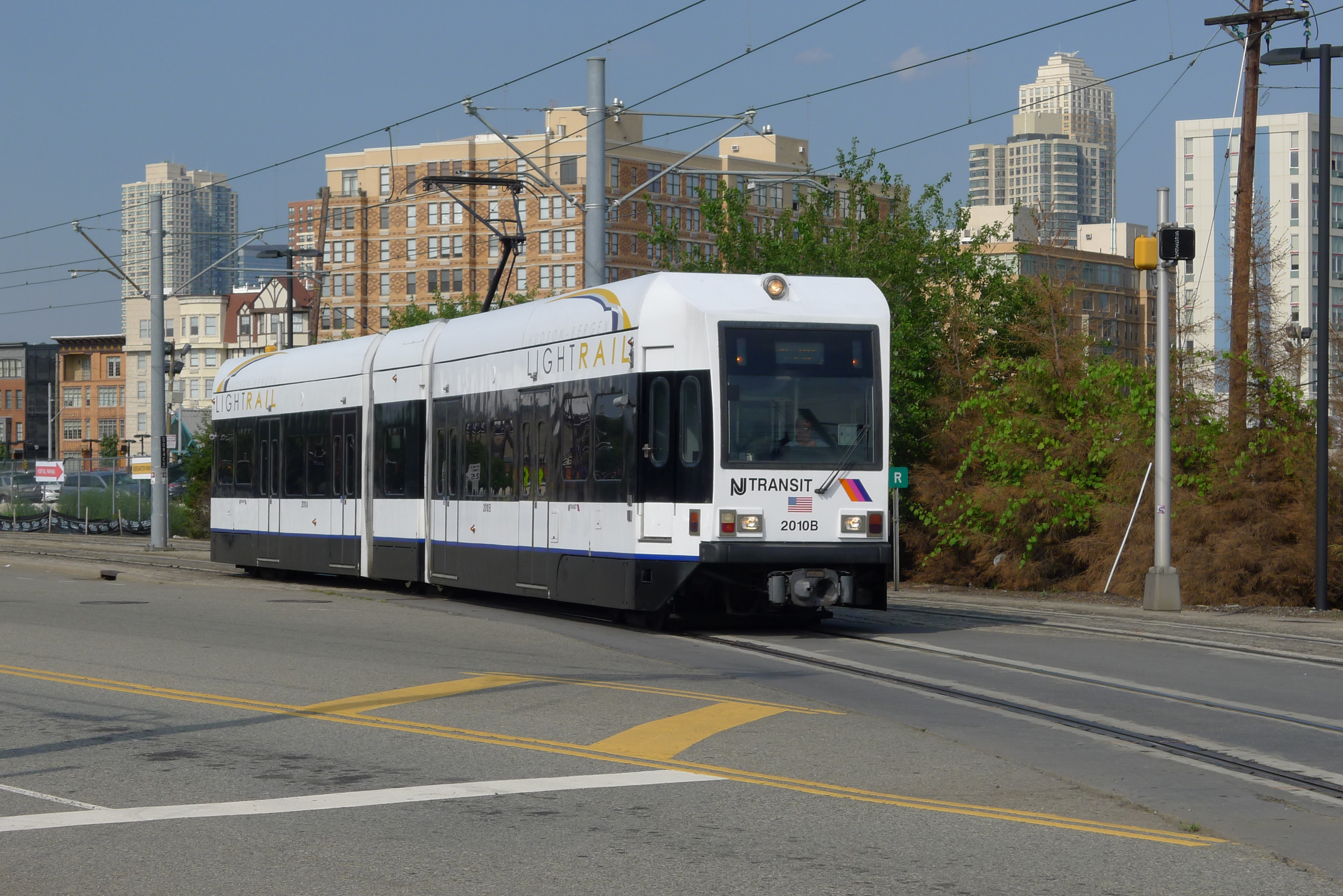
- Train traveling from Jersey Avenue to Liberty State Park in Jersey City

Overview
- Owner: New Jersey Transit
- Locale: Hudson County, New Jersey, U.S.
- Termini: Tonnelle Avenue Hoboken Terminal; 8th Street West Side Avenue
- Stations: 24

Service
- Type: Light rail
- Services: 3
- Operator(s): Twenty-First Century Rail (AECOM and Kinkisharyo)
- Ridership: 15,800,000 (FY2025)

History
- Opened: April 15, 2000; 26 years ago

Technical
- Line length: 17 mi (27.4 km)
- Character: Surface and elevated
- Track gauge: 4 ft 8 1/2 in (1,435 mm) standard gauge
- Electrification: Overhead line, 750 V DC
- Operating speed: 55 mph (89 km/h)

The Hudson–Bergen Light Rail (HBLR) is a light rail system in Hudson County, New Jersey, United States. Owned by New Jersey Transit (NJT) and operated by the ACI-Herzog Joint Venture of Boston, it connects the communities of Bayonne, Jersey City, Hoboken, Weehawken, Union City (at the city line with West New York), and North Bergen.

The system began operating its first segment in April 2000, expanded in phases during the next decade, and was completed with the opening of its southern terminus on January 31, 2011. The line generally runs parallel to the Hudson River and Upper New York Bay, while its northern end and its western branch travel through the lower Hudson Palisades. HBLR has 24 stations along a total track length of 17 miles (27 km) for each of its two tracks and as of 2017 serves over 52,000 weekday passengers. Despite its name, the system does not serve Bergen County, into which long-standing plans for expansion have not advanced due to repeated requests for new environmental review reports since 2007.

The project was financed by a mixture of state and federal funding. With an eventual overall cost of approximately $2.2 billion to complete its initial operating segments, the Hudson–Bergen Light Rail was one of the largest ever public works projects in New Jersey. The system is a component of the state's "smart growth" strategy to reduce car-ridership and to revitalize older urban and suburban areas through transit-oriented development.

== History ==
Hudson County, New Jersey, is the sixth-most densely populated county in the U.S. and has one of America's highest percentages of public transportation use. During the 1980s and early 1990s, planners and government officials realized that alternative transportation systems needed to be put in place to relieve increasing congestion along the Hudson Waterfront, particularly in the vicinity of the Hudson River crossings. After extensive studies, it was decided that the most efficient and cost-effective system to meet the growing demands of the area would be a light rail system, constructed in several phases.

The design, construction, operation, and maintenance of the system is part of a public-private partnership. In 1996, New Jersey Transit awarded a design, build, operate, and maintain (DBOM) contract to the 21st Century Rail Corporation, a consortium of Raytheon, Itochu and Kinki Sharyo. Under the contract, 21st Century Rail deliver a fleet of vehicles, a guaranteed completion date, and 15 years of operation and maintenance of the system, for a fixed price. The agreement was later extended to a 20-year period.

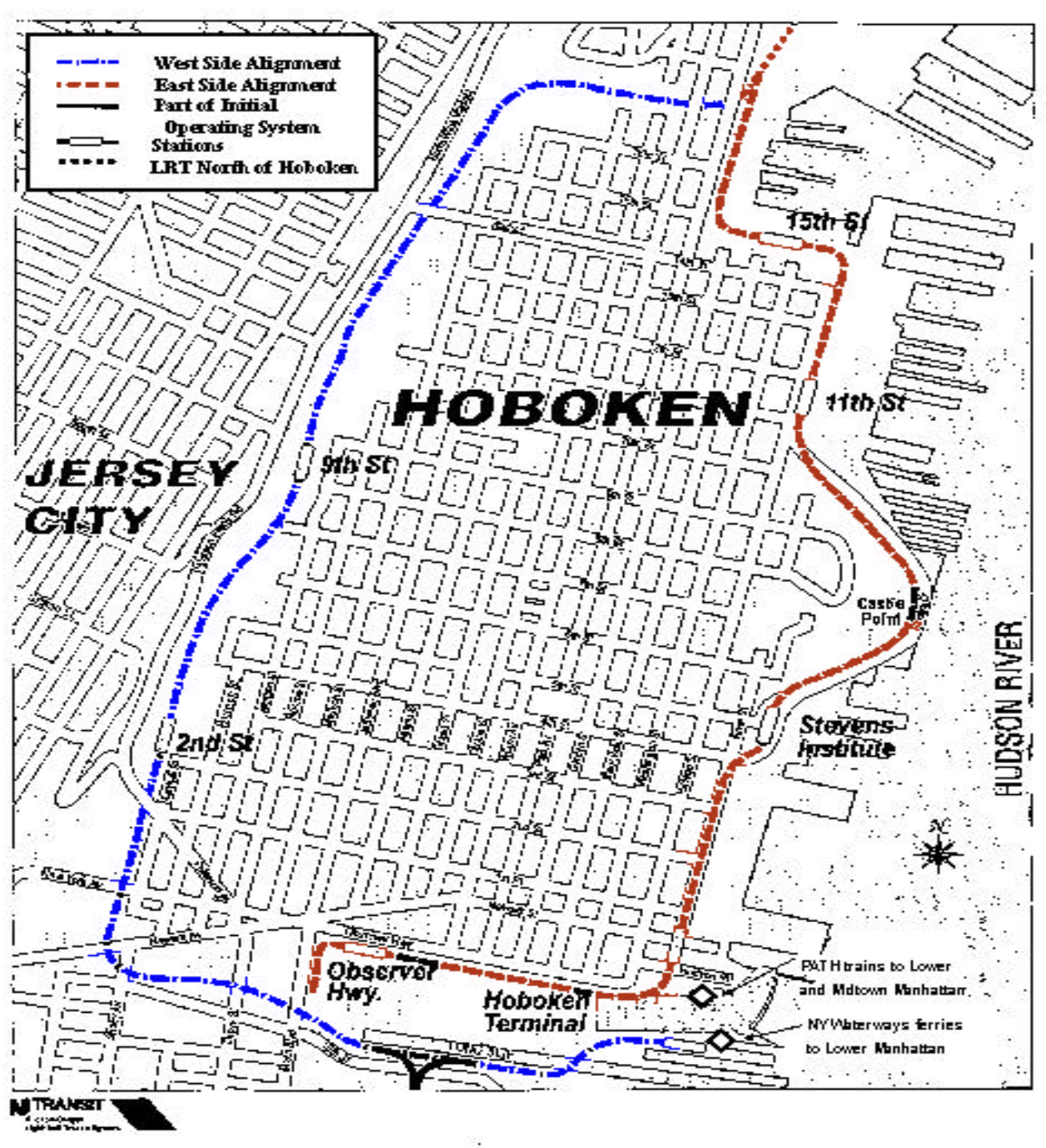

Original plans called for extending the Hudson–Bergen Light Rail north to the Vince Lombardi Park & Ride in Ridgefield, south to 5th Street in Bayonne, and west to Droyer's Point in Jersey City. In Hoboken, the line was to have originally been configured as a through-running operation, with an alignment built closer to the river which would have given closer access to both the PATH station entrance and the bus terminal. This was shelved in favor of the current stub-end station in the southern end of Hoboken Terminal and the current route along an existing right-of-way at the foot of the Hudson Palisades on the city's west side.

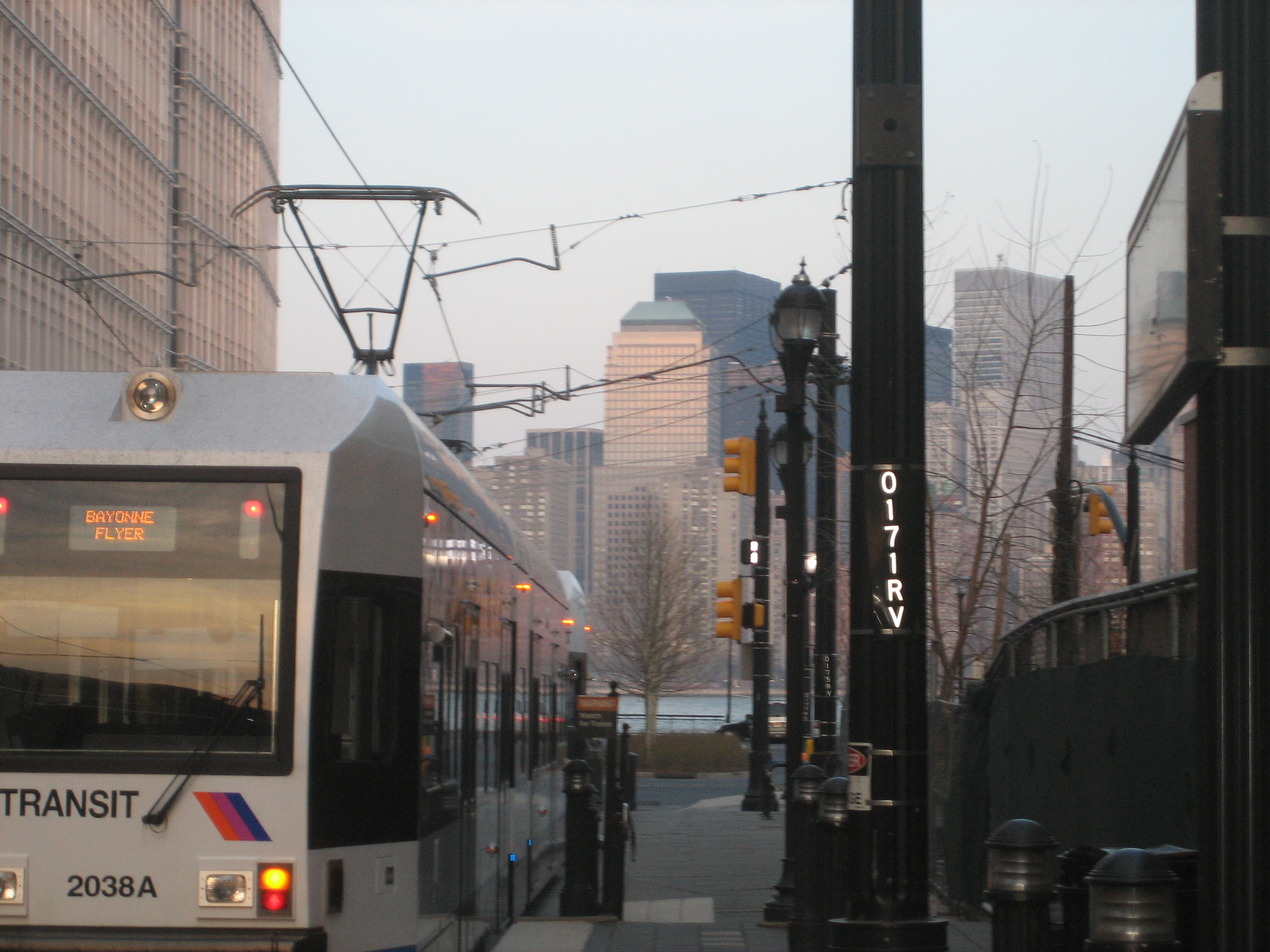
An HBLR train in Paulus Hook in 2006

The light rail opened to the public on April 15, 2000, with an initial operating segment connecting Bayonne 34th Street and Exchange Place, as well as the spur line to West Side Avenue. Later that year, on November 18, the service was extended northward to Pavonia-Newport. On September 29, 2002, service was extended to Hoboken Terminal, which completed MOS-1, the first Minimum Operating Segment (MOS) of the project, at the cost of $992 million.

MOS-2 involved several extensions costing a combined $1.2 billion. The first extension as part of MOS-2, which brought the light rail system southward to 22nd Street in Bayonne, was opened on November 15, 2003. It also involved extending the line west and north of Hoboken Terminal into Weehawken. The line was completed to Lincoln Harbor on September 7, 2004, and to Port Imperial on weekends only on October 29, 2005. The line was extended from Port Imperial to Tonnelle Avenue in North Bergen on February 25, 2006, and light rail vehicles began running seven days a week to Tonnelle Avenue. Bus service on connecting routes was modified so that there would be more direct connections to Hudson–Bergen Light Rail stations. The extension to a southern terminal at 8th Street opened January 31, 2011, at a cost of $100 million.

Service on the West Side Branch was suspended starting in June 2019 to allow for repairs to a sewer line running along the right-of-way. Partial service was restored on the branch in April 2020 to the Garfield Avenue and Martin Luther King Dr. stations while the West Side Avenue station remained closed due to ongoing Bayfront-Route 440 extension construction. Full service to the West Side Avenue station resumed in May 2020.

In November 2024, it was announced that the operations of the system will be transitioned to ACI-Herzog JV by September 2025.

== Service ==
=== Routes ===
System map with connecting rail service

There are 24 stations along the routes within the system. Trains run from approximately 5 a.m. to 1 a.m. daily.

- West Side–Tonnelle between West Side Avenue in Jersey City and Tonnelle Avenue in North Bergen
- Hoboken–Tonnelle (weekdays only) between Hoboken Terminal and Tonnelle Avenue
- Bayonne–Hoboken, between 8th Street in Bayonne and Hoboken Terminal
- Bayonne Flyer, (weekday rush hours) between 8th Street in Bayonne and Hoboken Terminal, stopping at all Bayonne stations, Liberty State Park (southbound only), Essex Street, Exchange Place, Harborside Financial Center, and Newport

=== Stations ===
Many of the stations feature public art. A total of 30 artists have created 50 art works with various themes for the stations. For example, the Liberty State Park station features glass tiles representing a number of "fallen flag" railroad logos.

Park and ride lots are available at East 22nd Street, East 34th Street, West Side Avenue, Liberty State Park and Tonnelle Avenue. In total, there are 3,880 parking spaces.

Paid transfer to the Port Authority Trans-Hudson (PATH) is possible at Exchange Place, Newport and Hoboken Terminal, where connections to NJT commuter rail service are also available. Paid transfer to New York Waterway ferries is also available at some stations. NJT and other buses serve most stations.

City	Station	Weekday entries (2025)	Services	Opened	Transfers and notes
North Bergen	Tonnelle Avenue	1,087	West Side–Tonnelle; Hoboken–Tonnelle	February 25, 2006	Park and ride
Union City	Bergenline Avenue	3,025	West Side–Tonnelle; Hoboken–Tonnelle	February 25, 2006	
Weehawken	Port Imperial	1,275	West Side–Tonnelle; Hoboken–Tonnelle	October 29, 2005	NY Waterway
Weehawken	Lincoln Harbor	883	West Side–Tonnelle; Hoboken–Tonnelle	September 7, 2004	NY Waterway
Hoboken	9th Street–Congress Street	2,870	West Side–Tonnelle; Hoboken–Tonnelle	September 7, 2004	
Hoboken	2nd Street	1,551	West Side–Tonnelle; Hoboken–Tonnelle	September 7, 2004	
Hoboken	Hoboken Terminal	3,751	Hoboken–Tonnelle; Bayonne–Hoboken	September 29, 2002	PATH trains; NJ Transit rail; NY Waterway
Jersey City	Newport	5,666	West Side–Tonnelle; Bayonne–Hoboken	November 18, 2000	
Jersey City	Harsimus Cove	1,757	West Side–Tonnelle; Bayonne–Hoboken	November 18, 2000	
Jersey City	Harborside	1,516	West Side–Tonnelle; Bayonne–Hoboken	November 18, 2000	
Jersey City	Exchange Place	6,090	West Side–Tonnelle; Bayonne–Hoboken	April 15, 2000	PATH trains (at Exchange Place); NY Waterway
Jersey City	Essex Street	1,298	West Side–Tonnelle; Bayonne–Hoboken	April 15, 2000	Liberty Landing Ferry
Jersey City	Marin Boulevard	1,380	West Side–Tonnelle; Bayonne–Hoboken	April 15, 2000	NY Waterway
Jersey City	Jersey Avenue	1,661	West Side–Tonnelle; Bayonne–Hoboken	April 15, 2000	
Jersey City	Liberty State Park	3,395	West Side–Tonnelle; Bayonne–Hoboken	April 15, 2000	Park and ride
Jersey City	Garfield Avenue	1,224	West Side–Tonnelle	April 15, 2000	
Jersey City	Martin Luther King Drive	1,719	West Side–Tonnelle	April 15, 2000	
Jersey City	West Side Avenue	2,432	West Side–Tonnelle	April 15, 2000	Park and ride
Jersey City	Richard Street	1,602	Bayonne–Hoboken	April 15, 2000	
Jersey City	Danforth Avenue	1,248	Bayonne–Hoboken	April 15, 2000	
Bayonne	45th Street	1,468	Bayonne–Hoboken	April 15, 2000	
Bayonne	34th Street	1,484	Bayonne–Hoboken	April 15, 2000	Park and ride
Bayonne	22nd Street	2,200	Bayonne–Hoboken	November 15, 2003	Park and ride
Bayonne	8th Street	1,860	Bayonne–Hoboken	January 31, 2011	Park and ride

== Fares ==
Like most other light rail services in the United States, the HBLR operates on a proof-of-payment system, in which riders must present their tickets upon request during random fare inspections. Passengers must purchase tickets at NJ Transit ticket vending machines (TVMs) on or near station platforms or from the NJ Transit app. One-way, round-trip, and ten-trip tickets must then be validated at automated validators located near the TVMs, which date and time stamp the ticket for 60 minutes of use. NJ Transit's fare inspectors randomly check tickets on trains and at stations; as of 2014, the fine for fare evasion is $100.

As of 2024, a one-way adult fare is $2.65. A monthly, unlimited pass is $84; holders of monthly passes can transfer to NJ Transit local buses without an additional fare. Senior citizens (62 and older; valid ID may be requested), passengers with disabilities, and children under 12 may travel on the light rail at a reduced fare of $1.25. The option to purchase combined bus and light rail fares has been removed. Valid NJ Transit weekly and monthly rail passes, as well as 2-zone or greater bus passes, are also good for light rail travel, and do not need validation. Like the rest of NJ Transit's other transportation modes, it does not accept the MTA's OMNY nor PATH's TAPP, although, as of 2025, its own tap system, FARE-PAY, works for travel on the light rail.

In May 2012, NJ Transit and NY Waterway introduced a monthly or ten-trip discounted combination fare for passengers using the HBLR and ferry at Weehawken Port Imperial. Monthly joint tickets are also available for ferry passengers using slips at Lincoln Harbor and 14th Street (Hoboken).

In February 2013, NJ Transit began offering free weekend parking at Tonnelle Avenue, Liberty State Park, West Side Avenue, 34th Street and 45th Street stations.

== Infrastructure ==
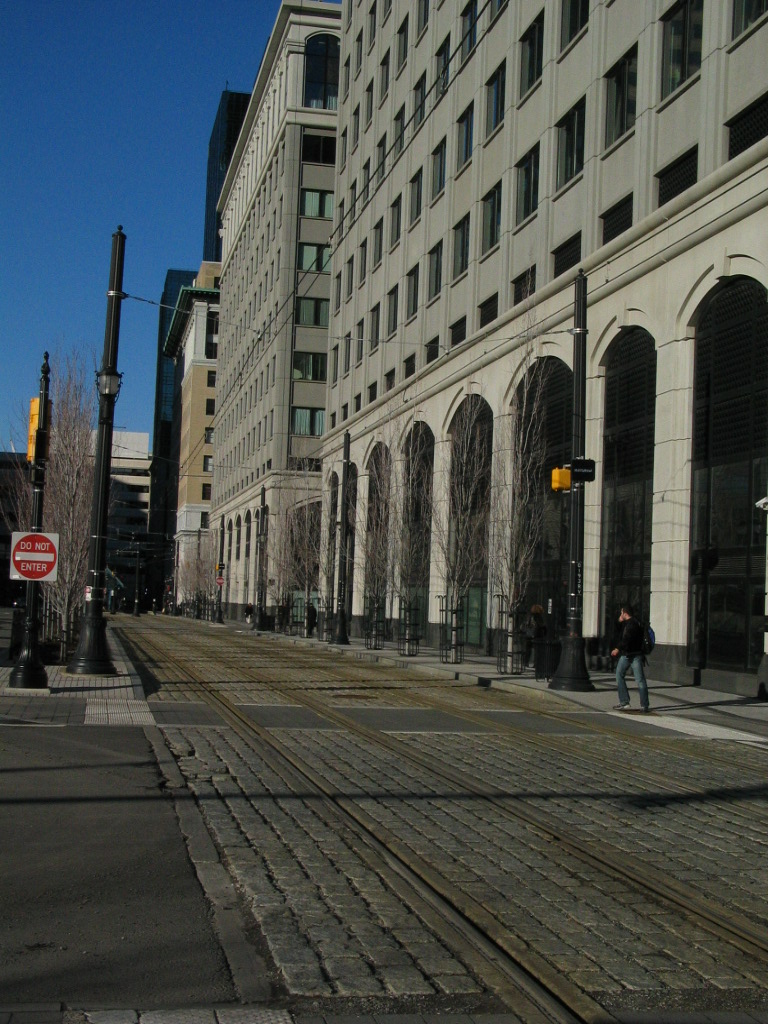
Exclusive ROW approaching Exchange Place in Jersey City

The Hudson–Bergen Light Rail system uses a combination of old rail and new exclusive rights-of-way for most of its length, with some grade separation in certain areas. It shares a lane with automobiles on a portion of Essex Street in downtown Jersey City, but for the most part, does not operate with other traffic. At-grade crossings are equipped with transit-signal priority signals to automatically change traffic lights in favor of the light rail.

A new curved viaduct was constructed eastward from 8th Street to 11th Street in Bayonne to join the existing right-of way to Liberty State Park, which was once the main line of the Central Railroad of New Jersey (CNJ), parts of which rest on the bed of the Morris Canal; CNJ's Newark and New York Branch right-of-way was used for the line west to West Side Avenue. From Liberty State Park to Hoboken Terminal the line uses a new right-of-way. From the terminal to the curve south of 2nd Street, the line runs parallel to NJT yard and tracks, formerly the main line of the Lackawanna Railroad; north of the curve it uses what had been Conrail's River Line, and was originally the New Jersey Junction Railroad. In order to obtain the right-of-way for the line north from Hoboken, NJT paid to upgrade the Northern Running Track, allowing Conrail to shift its operations. The tunnel and cut through the Palisades were originally the West Shore Railroad's main line.

== Rolling stock ==
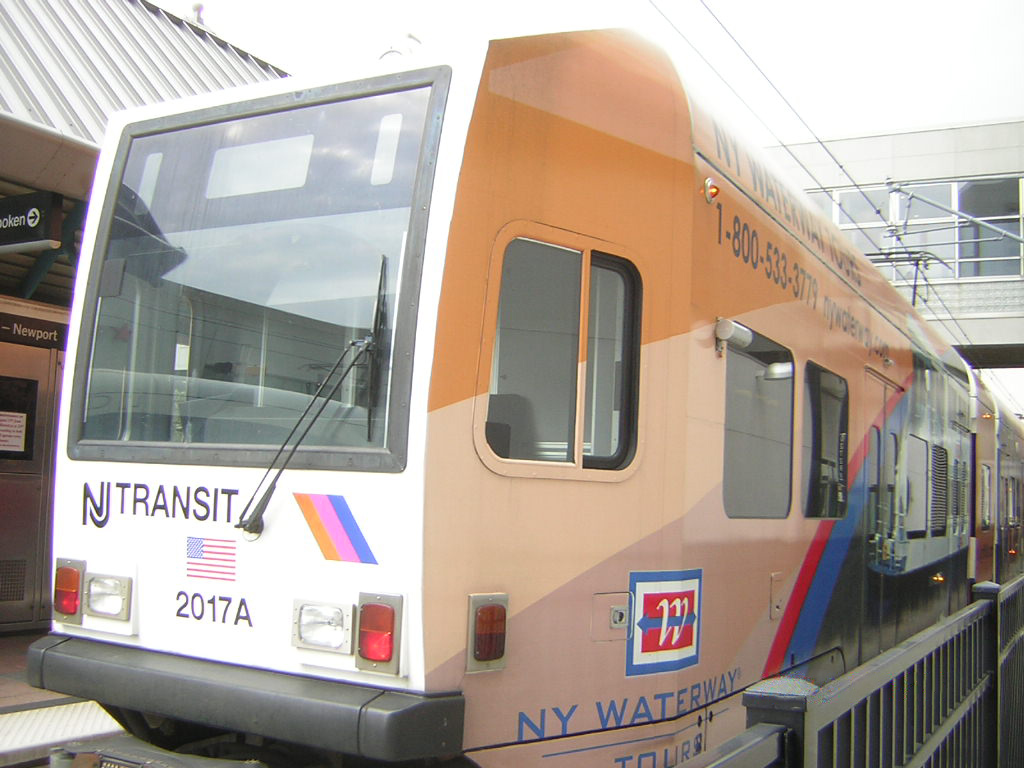
Train number 2017A at Pavonia/Newport

The Hudson–Bergen Light Rail system has 52 electrically powered air-conditioned vehicles built by Kinki Sharyo and numbered in the 2000 series. The cars were assembled in Harrison, New Jersey. The original fleet consisted of 54 cars, but two cars were transferred to the Newark Light Rail. Each vehicle is 90 feet (27.43 m) long and has four sets of double-opening doors on each side, with seats for 68 passengers and standing room for another 122 passengers.

The Newark Light Rail system uses the same type of vehicle, with slight modifications to the trucks and wheels to handle the tight turn of the Penn Station loop that was originally built for PCC cars.

On July 3, 2013, NJ Transit introduced lengthened light rail car 2054 as a prototype. The expanded car consists of two new sections, increasing length by 37 feet (11.28 m) to a total of 127 feet (38.71 m). Seating capacity is increased from 68 passengers to 102 passengers, with standing capacity increased accordingly as well. Overall capacity increases from approximately 200 per vehicle to 300 per vehicle. The prototype was placed on rotations through the three lines of the system over the next 6 months, after which, NJ Transit started to expand 26 cars in total, or half of the total fleet. The contract to expand the remaining balance of 25 cars was approved on July 9, 2014. The expanded cars were renumbered to the 5000 series.

== Proposed expansions ==
=== Route 440/Bayfront ===
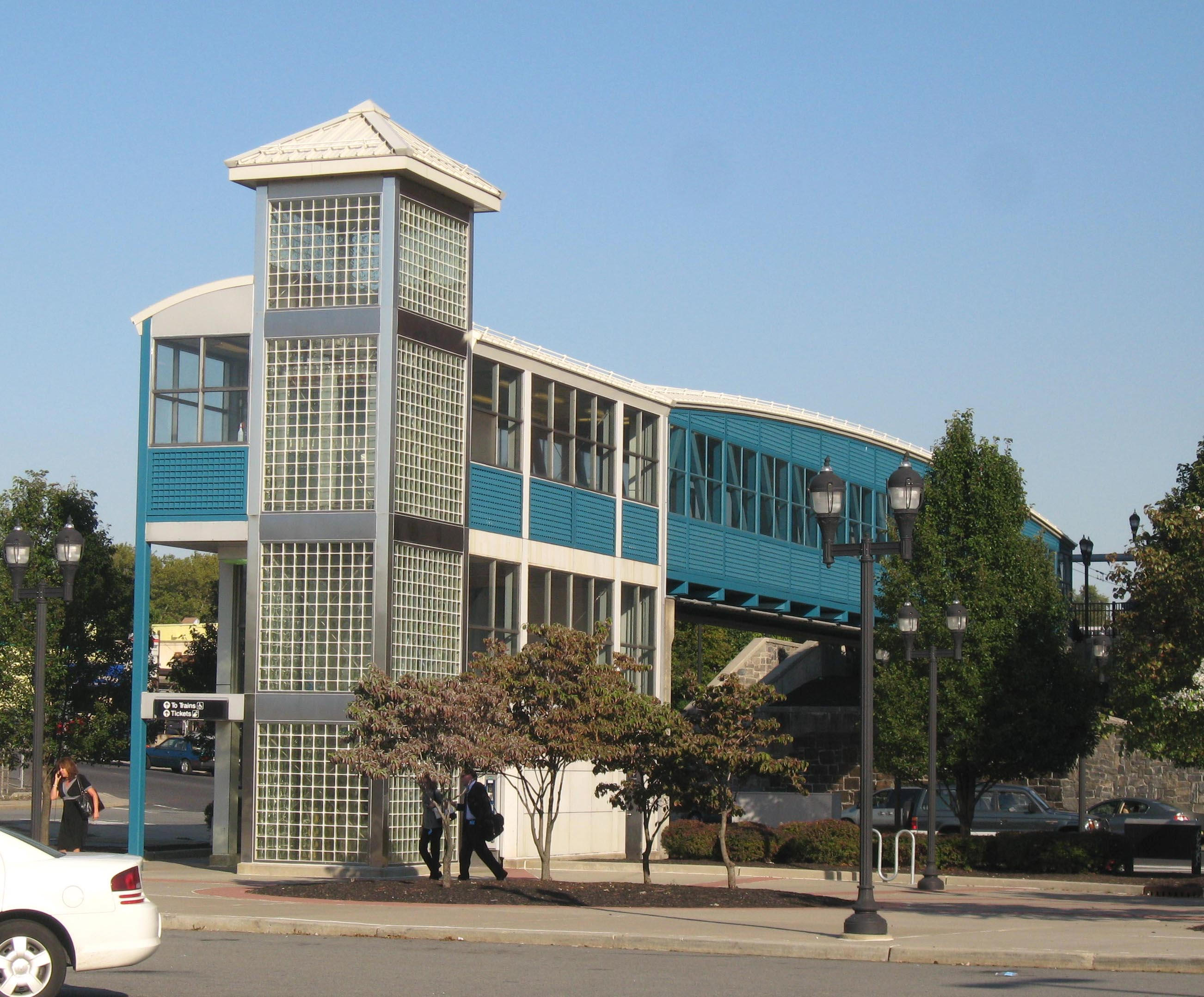
Viaduct from West Side Avenue will be extended over Route 440

In May 2011 NJT announced a plan for 0.7-mile (1.1 km) extension of the West Side Branch. The project, which requires the approval of the metropolitan planning organization, North Jersey Transportation Planning Authority, to be eligible for federal funding, is estimated to cost $171.6 million. The extension is part of a broader plan to transform the far West Side of Jersey City from previous industrial uses to mixed-use communities that also includes the development of the West Campus of New Jersey City University (currently under construction) and conversion of Route 440 to an urban boulevard.

As of March 2017, funding for final design and engineering work was appropriated. In December 2017, NJ Transit approved a $5 million preliminary engineering contract for the extension project. Construction on the first phase of the extension began in March 2020.

=== 18th Street, Jersey City ===
The results of the Jersey City/Hoboken Connectivity Study published in June 2011 identified the target area at southwestern Hoboken, Lower Jersey City, and Jersey City Heights as a potential site for a new station. The HBLR runs at the foot the Hudson Palisades under NJT's Hoboken Terminal lines with the 2nd Street station north of the ROW. The district is characterized as having an irregular street grid (including colonial-era Paterson Plank Road and Newark Plank Road), being heavily congested (often with Holland Tunnel–bound traffic) and undergoing transition to a residential/commercial uses. In September 2012, a walkway/bike path was completed near the site of the proposed station, providing better pedestrian access to it and the nearby 2nd St. station. It was announced in October 2012 that NJT had received a $400,000 grant to study the possibility of building a new station at 18th Street in Jersey City, just south of the municipal border and NJT commuter rail ROW.

In January 2020, the City of Jersey City began to consider 3.5% tax on public and private parking facilities to help fund the construction of a new light rail station at 18th Street.

A 2021 proposal by Lefrak to build a two-tower mixed use development along the light rail ROW between Jersey Avenue & Grove Street including a light rail station, potentially funded in part by the developer.

=== Northwest Hoboken ===
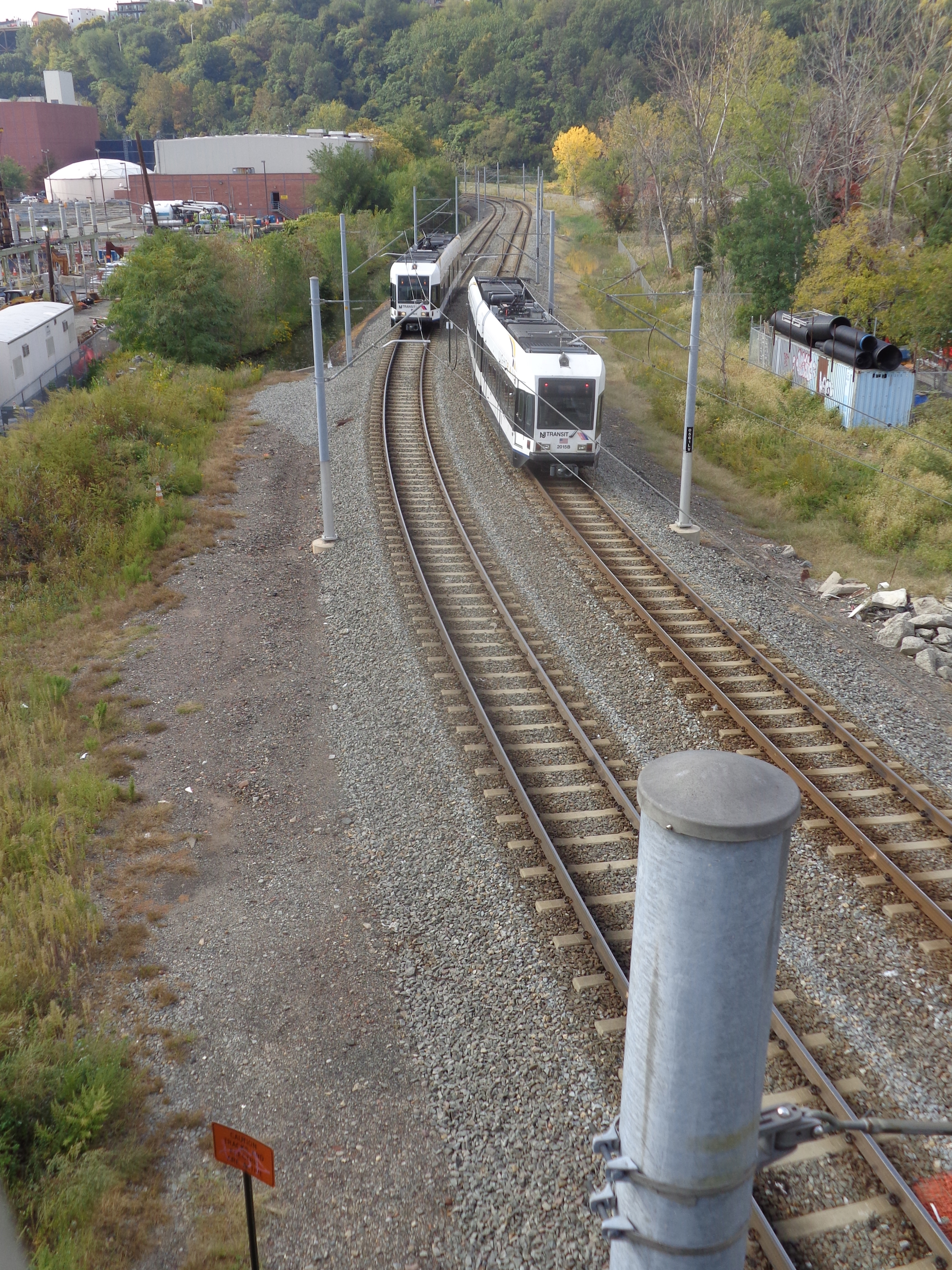
17th Street at Hoboken–Weehawken line

According to The New York Times, NJT approved plans in June 2013 for a new light rail station in northwestern Hoboken, near property owned by the Rockefeller Group, which wanted to build a 40-story office tower in that area near the city's northern border with Weehawken. This agreement was not made known to the local government. but came to light after Mayor of Hoboken Dawn Zimmer, appearing on MSNBC on January 18, 2014, claimed that Lt Governor Kim Guadagno and Richard Constable, director of the New Jersey Department of Community Affairs, had earlier insinuated to her that more Sandy relief funds would be released to the city if it approved the project proposed by Rockefeller. The agreement is dated June 21, 2014. The plans showed a station at 17th Street and Clinton Street.

In January 2020, Mayor Ravinder Bhalla met with representatives of NJ Transit to discuss a potential new station in the area. It included in city's North End master plan.

=== Northern Branch/Bergen County ===
Despite its name, the Hudson–Bergen Light Rail only serves Hudson County. The Northern Branch is a proposed extension from the current northern terminus at Tonnelle Avenue using the right of way of the former Erie Northern Branch into eastern Bergen County with a new terminus at the Englewood Hospital and Medical Center. Stops would be added at 91st Street in North Bergen, Fairview, Ridgefield, Palisades Park, Leonia, and Englewood, with stops at Englewood Route 4 and Englewood Town Center.

An earlier proposal to use diesel multiple unit (DMU) vehicles was later abandoned in favor of the electrically operated system used by HBLR as were proposals to extend the line into Tenafly. The estimated cost of the project is $1.18 billion, though funding has not been secured. An initial $40 million has been allocated for design, engineering and environmental studies. The project requires approval of an environmental impact statement and Federal Transit Administration approval. Funding for completion if the environmental study, expected to take two years, was approved by NJ Transit in May 2013. After being stalled as of May 2017 funding for the project was thought to finally be proceeding in 2017, but no progress was made.

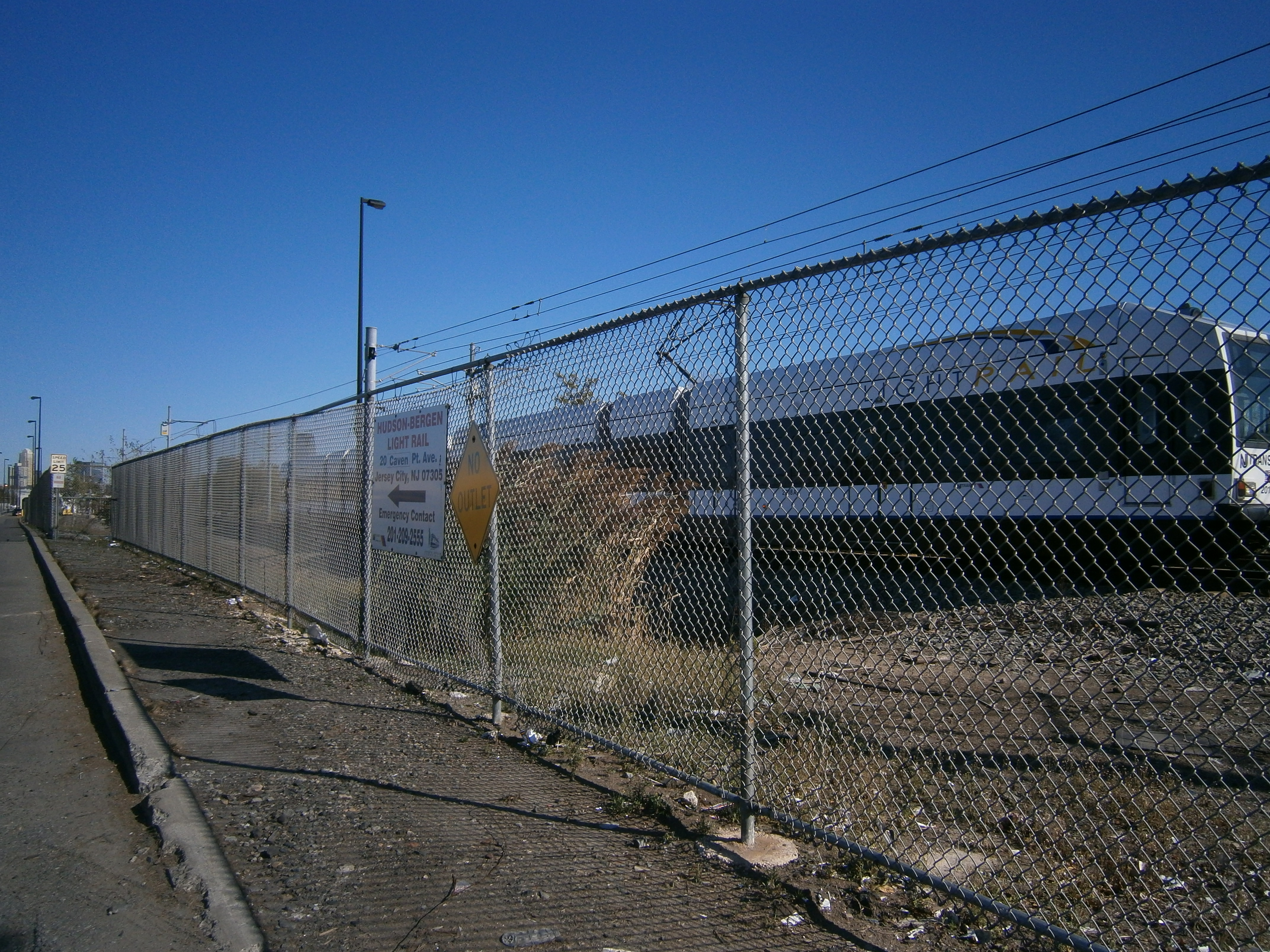
Site of proposed Caven Point Avenue station at Canal Crossing

=== Canal Crossing ===
The two branches of the HBLR system create the northern and eastern borders of Canal Crossing, a planned New Urbanist community in Jersey City. A new station at Caven Point Avenue is proposed on the Bayonne line along its eastern perimeter between current stations at Richard Street and Liberty State Park. A feasibility study conducted in 2012 found that though the construction of a station at Caven Point Avenue was theoretically possible, it would be much more expensive than the average light rail station, while the projected ridership would be relatively low in the near-term.

=== Secaucus Junction/Meadowlands ===
There have been discussions to extend the system westward to either or both of Secaucus Junction, a major interchange station of New Jersey Transit rail operations, and the Meadowlands Sports Complex (MSC). Possible routes include one from Downtown Jersey City, via the Harsimus Stem Embankment and Bergen Arches, or an extension of the line from Tonnelle Avenue.

Several studies have been conducted to determine the best future use of the Bergen Arches, the former Erie Railroad cut through Bergen Hill in Jersey City. A freeway proposed in 1989 by Governor Thomas Kean was strongly supported by then-Mayor Bret Schundler. In 1998, this project was allocated $26 million in the federal Transportation Equity Act for the 21st Century. During the 2001 mayoral race candidates instead lobbied for a mass transit line, and in 2002 the plans were dropped during Mayor Cunningham's administration. In that year, Parsons Brinckerhoff, a consulting firm, released another report commission by the New Jersey Department of Transportation (NJDOT) describing the conditions and analysis of various options. NJDOT has continued to fund studies for the project. In March 2011, an additional $13.4 million was allocated to advance the project.

In the first decade of the 21st century, studies sponsored by the New Jersey Sports and Exposition Authority were conducted to address mass transit options to the MSC, including the possible extension of HBLR from its northern terminus through Secaucus and across the Hackensack River. At the time it was estimated that the extension would cost $1 billion. When it was decided to build a rail spur in 2004, state officials said that an HBLR extension was not ruled out as a future possibility. The Meadowlands Rail Line was eventually opened in 2009.

In 2022, state introduced a plan for a new east-bound Route 3 Bridge over the Hackensack River. Pilings would support a light rail extension, though there is no projected timeline for service.

=== Bayonne Bridge/Staten Island ===
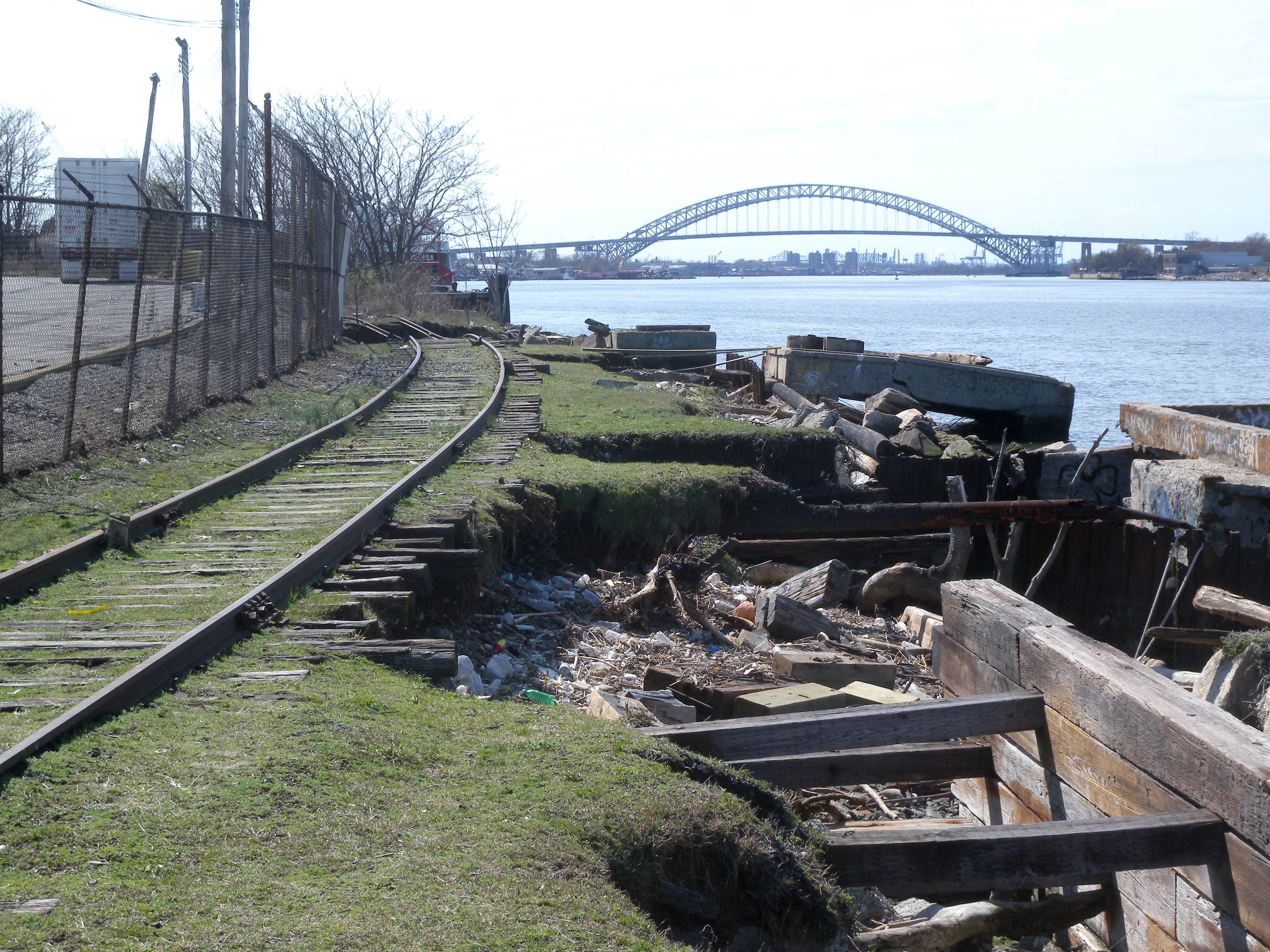
A right of way to connect to a potential light rail system on Staten Island was not included in the original Bayonne Bridge "raising the roadbed" reconstruction plans

The Bayonne Bridge connects Bayonne and Staten Island, a borough of New York City. The bridge was originally built to accommodate two extra lanes that could be used for light rail service. In the 2010s the Port Authority of New York and New Jersey raised the roadbed of the bridge by 64 feet (20 m), in order to provide the 215-foot (66 m) clearance required by the newer post-panamax container ships to pass under it. Final plans for the reconstructed bridge eventually did not include a rail element.

In September 2007, the S89 limited-stop bus service was introduced between Richmond Avenue in Staten Island and the 34th Street HBLR station. As of February 2018, it runs only during the weekday peak period.

While not having begun any studies, New Jersey Transit investigated the feasibility of extending HBLR from the 8th Street Station across the raised bridge. An academic study has been produced in the Journal of Public Transportation. Completing any such extension would involve a collaboration between NJ Transit, New York State, and New York City. The development of a Staten Island light rail system which could connect with the HBLR system gained political support in New York. US Senator Robert Menendez supported the HBLR extension conceptually, but questioned the benefit for New Jersey. The Metropolitan Transportation Authority's 2015–2019 Capital Plan was amended in May 2017 to allocate $4 million to study the potential extension.

=== Liberty State Park trolley ===
Shuttle bus service formerly operated from the Liberty State Park station to the waterfront Central Railroad of New Jersey Terminal in Liberty State Park. However, this service no longer runs, and as a result, there is a relatively long walk to access the Central Railroad terminal via mass transit. Since at least 2010, there have been proposals to build a trolley line to the Central Railroad terminal building and other points in the park from the Liberty State Park Station light rail station to improve access. The Liberty Historic Railway organization is also attempting to jump start the construction of this trolley line. As of 2020, the Liberty Historic Railway Organization has ceased all work on the Liberty State Park trolley proposal as a result of the damage the park received from Hurricane Sandy and how vulnerable any rail infrastructure within the park associated with the proposed trolley would be to future storm surges.

== Transit-oriented development and urban revitalization ==
The light rail has been a catalyst for both residential and commercial development along the route, and played a significant role in the revitalization of Hudson County. Many of the stops are located in vacant or underutilized areas, which are now beginning to see intense residential and mixed-use redevelopment. The line running along Essex Street in downtown Jersey City has spawned 3,000 residential units in five years. An 86-acre (350,000 m^{2}) tract of land bordering Liberty State Park is being redeveloped into a transit-oriented development known as Liberty Harbor North, which will consist of 6,000 residential units and millions of square feet of commercial space. Two New Urbanism projects in Jersey City, Bayfront and Canal Crossing, are being planned with the expectation that new stations will be built in conjunction with their development. Other developments are either planned or already underway in Hoboken, Union City, Bayonne, and Weehawken, in areas very close to light rail stations.

== See also ==
- Newark Light Rail
- River Line
- Light rail in the United States
- List of United States light rail systems by ridership
- Light rail in North America
- List of tram and light rail transit systems
- List of rail transit systems in the United States

== Sources ==
- "On track to reborn cityscape: The Hudson-Bergen Light Rail line proves a boon for older urban areas" by Steve Chambers, Newark Star-Ledger, October 30, 2005.
- "Xanadu rail plan could be boon for N.J. official" by Shannon D. Harrington, The Record (Bergen County), May 6, 2005.
- "Light-rail link might cost $1B; Study for Meadowlands extension OK'd" by John Brennan, The Record (Bergen County), April 28, 2005.
- "Light rail to Tenafly is still a dream; NJ Transit says more study needed" by Soni Sangha, The Record (Bergen County), January 23, 2005.
