= Raanan =

Raanan or Ra'anan (Hebrew: רענן), meaning "fresh", is a Jewish name that may refer to the following notable people:

Given name

- Ra'anan Alexandrowicz (born 1969), Israeli film director, screenwriter and editor
- Ra'anan Cohen (born 1941), Israeli politician
- Raanan Gillon (born 1941), British professor of medical ethics
- Raanan Gissin (1949–2023), Israeli political scientist
- Raanan Hershberg (born 1984), American comedian
- Ra'anan Levy (1954–2022), French-Israeli artist
- Ra'anan Naim (1935–2009), Israeli politician
- Raanan Rein (born 1960), Israeli historian
- Raanan Zilberman (born 1960), Israeli businessman

Surname

- Gili Raanan (born 1969), Israeli venture capitalist
- Justin Raanan, American periodontist
- Uri Ra'anan (1926–2020), American political scientist
- Yoav Ra'anan (born 1928), Israeli Olympic diver
