= Raoul Middleman =

American painter (1935–2021)

- Raoul Middleman, "Inside Out," 1983, oil on canvas
- Born: 1935; Baltimore, Maryland, U.S.
- Died: October 29, 2021 (aged 86)
- Known for: Painting

Raoul Middleman (1935 – October 29, 2021) was an American painter known for his "provocatively prolific work--primarily traditional, including figure studies, landscapes, and still lifes--and for being a megawatt personality." Middleman was a member of the Maryland Institute College of Art faculty from 1961 on. In a 2009 Baltimore City Paper article Bret McCabe described Middleman's paintings as featuring "... expressive strokes, a tight control over an earthy palette, a romantic tone slightly offset by a penetrating eye —becomes distinctive even if you haven’t seen them before, so strongly does he articulate his old-fashioned sensibility in his works.”

American University Museum at the Katzen Center described Middleman as a "Baltimore maestro [whose] nudes are not pretty—they are sagging, dimpled, and real. His cityscapes reveal the underbelly of post-industrial rot, his narrative paintings give contemporary life to his personal obsessions. They are intelligent, messy, and utterly masterful."

Mike Guliano also writing in the Baltimore City Paper said ...."Other artists would look at the relatively undramatic landscape of this region and respond with quiet paintings, but Middleman sees all of nature as being animated. If anything, the countryside is so inherently full of life that animals, people, and buildings are usually no more than blips on the horizon." Giuliano continued on to say, "Middleman's theatrical and somewhat claustrophobic portraits remain firmly within a studio environment; when he goes to the country, people pretty much drop from the scene. It's as if the landscape itself is so completely exposed that placing a female nude out there would be redundant."

Paintings by Middleman can be found in private and corporate collections such as Baltimore Museum of Art, MD; Johns Hopkins Hospital, Baltimore, MD; Corcoran Gallery of Art, Washington DC; National Gallery of Art, Washington DC; Metropolitan Museum of Art, NY; National Academy of Design, NY; New York Public Library, NY; and Syracuse University, NY.

The C. Grimaldis Gallery in Baltimore, Maryland, has represented Middleman since 1977. Troika Gallery Troika Gallery in Easton, Maryland, has represented Middleman since 1997. The owners/artists of Troika Gallery are closely associated with Raoul in both a personal and professional manner. Middleman died on October 29, 2021.

== Education ==
1959

- Pennsylvania Academy of Fine Arts, Philadelphia, Pennsylvania

1961

- Brooklyn Museum Art School, Brooklyn, New York

1960

- Skowhegan Summer School, Skowhegan, Maine

1955

- B.A. Johns Hopkins University, Baltimore, Maryland

== Selected solo exhibitions ==
2011

- Kouros Gallery, New York, NY
- also 09, 07, 04

2010

- Howard Community College, Columbia, MD

2009

- C. Grimaldis Gallery, Baltimore, MD
- also 07, 05, 03, 01, 99, 84, 81, 79, 78

2007

- The Painting Center, New York, NY

2005

- Rodger Lapelle Galleries, Philadelphia, PA

2002

- Maryland Art Place, Baltimore, MD

2001

- Bavarian Paintings, Murnau, Germany

2000

- MB Modern, New York, NY

1999

- University of Maryland University College, College Park, MD
- Roger LaPelle Galleries, Philadelphia, PA
- Troika Gallery, Easton, MD

1998

- Ice Gallery, New York, NY
- also 97, 96

1997

- City Hall Galleries, Baltimore, MD

1994

- Steven Scott Gallery, Baltimore, MD

1991

- Jewish Community Center, Baltimore, MD

1989

- Ingber Gallery, New York, NY

1988

- Contemporary Realist Gallery, San Francisco, CA
- Swanston Fine Arts, Atlanta, GA

1986

- Anne Arundel Community College, Arnold, MD

1985

- Allan Stone Gallery, New York, NY
- also 81, 78, 75, 72, 69, 68
- Kornbluth Gallery (with Wolf Kahn), Fair Lawn, NJ

1983

- William Capro Gallery, New Bedford, MA

1982

- The Water Gap Gallery, Walpack Center, NJ

1981

- Boston University, Boston, MA

1980

- Yale Summer School of Art, Norfolk, CT
- Scott-McKennis Gallery, Richmond, VA

1974

- Maryland Institute College of Art, Baltimore, MD
- also 63

1966

- Krasner Gallery, New York, NY

== Selected group exhibitions ==
2007

- C. Grimaldis Gallery, Baltimore, MD “Summer ‘07”
- C. Grimaldis Gallery, Baltimore, MD “The Dialectic of Line”

2006

- C. Grimaldis Gallery, Baltimore, MD, “Summer Show”

2004

- C. Grimaldis Gallery, Baltimore, MD, “Narrative Visions, Works by: Grace Hartigan, Beverly McIver,

Raoul Middleman, George McNeil, Sangram Majumdar, David Rich, and Tony Shore”

1998

- National Academy, New York, NY “173rd Annual Exhibition”
- Ice Gallery, New York, NY
- C. Grimaldis Gallery, Baltimore, MD “The Painterly Landscape”

1997

- National Academy, New York, NY “172nd Annual Exhibition” [Benjamin Altman Prize]

1996

- American Academy of Arts and Letters, New York, NY “Invitational Exhibition”
- National Academy, New York, NY “171st Annual Exhibition”
- The Art Museum at Florida International University, Miami, FL “American Art Today: Images from Abroad”

1994

- National Academy, New York, NY “169th Annual Exhibition”

1993

- American Academy of Arts and Letters, New York, NY “Invitational Exhibition”

1992

- Artscape ‘92, Baltimore, MD “Masters, Mentors, and Makers” National Academy, New York, NY “167th Annual Exhibition”

1990

- National Academy, New York, NY “165th Annual Exhibition” [Robert and Rochelle Philipp Prize]
- University of Maryland, Baltimore County “A View from Baltimore to Washington”

1989

- Maryland Institute College of Art, Baltimore, MD “The Landscape Observed”
- Gaumann Cicchino Gallery, Fort Lauderdale, FL “The Landscape Revisited from Maine to Key West”

1988

- The Art Museum at Florida International University, Miami, FL “American Art Today: Narrative Painting”
- Norman and Sarah Brown Gallery, Jewish Community Center, Baltimore, MD “Invitation Exhibition (in honor of Israel’s 40th anniversary)” [First Prize]
- Maryland Art Place, Baltimore, MD “Landscape: Three Perspectives” 1987 School 33 Art Center, Baltimore, MD “Three on Three: Hartigan, Leake, Middleman”

1986

- Haus der Kunst, Munich “Das Automobil in der Kunst”

1985

- W.C. Bradley Company, Columbus, GA “Contemporary American Realists” 1984 Artist's Choice Museum, New York, NY “The First Eight Years”
- National Academy, New York, NY “159th Annual Exhibition”
- Thorpe Intermedia Gallery, Sparkill, NY “Primacy of Seeing”

1983

- One Penn Plaza, New York, NY “New Landscape”

1982

- Jersey City Museum, Jersey City, NJ “Painterly Landscape”
- William Capro Gallery, New Bedford, MA “The Artists’ Choice”
- Goucher College, Towson, MD “Contemporary Watercolors”

1976

- George Washington University, Washington, DC “The Painterly Vision”

== Selected collections ==
- American Broadcasting Company, New York, NY
- Baltimore Museum of Art, Baltimore, MD
- Corcoran Gallery of Art, Washington, DC
- Frye Museum of Art, Seattle, WA
- Hamline University, Saint Paul, MN
- Johns Hopkins Hospital, Baltimore, MD
- Metropolitan Museum of Art, New York, NY
- National Academy of Design, New York, NY
- National Gallery of Art, Washington, DC
- New York Public Library, New York, NY
- Syracuse University, Syracuse, NY
- Towson University, Towson, MD
- University of Maryland, College Park, MD

== Selected awards and honors ==
2003

- Edwin Palmer Memorial Prize, National Academy of Design, New York, NY

2001

- Artist In Residence, LMCC, World Trade Center, New York, NY

1998–2001

- President, National Academy of Design, New York, NY

1997

- Benjamin Altman Prize for Figure Painting, National Academy of Design, New York, NY

1990

- Robert & Rochelle Philipp Prize, National Academy of Design, New York, NY

== Suggested reading ==
- Rasmussen, Jack, "City Limits" (Washington D.C. and Baltimore, American University Museum and C. Grimaldis Gallery, 2012) ISBN 978-1-61979-499-3.
