= Caroline Ramersdorfer =

American sculptor

- Born: December 16, 1960 (age 65); Lustenau, Vorarlberg, Austria
- Education: Academy of Fine Arts, Carrara, Italy, Santa Reparata Graphic Art Center, Florence, Italy, UIA Universita internazionale dell’Arte Florence, Italy
- Known for: Sculpture
- Notable work: in museums: Artothek, City of Vienna, Austria, RAIBA Bank Art Collection, Bregenz, Austria; Olympic Park, Beijing, China
- Awards: 1st prize - Emaar Art Symposium Abu Dhabi, UAE; Fellowship - Austrian Ministry for Education, the Arts and Culture, Vienna for work in Japan; Golden Award - International Sculpture Exposition, Zhengzhou, China
- Website: carolineramersdorfer.at

Caroline Ramersdorfer is an Austrian-born sculptor with studios in upstate New York and Feldkirch in Vorarlberg, Austria. Her work, both small scale and monumental, has gained an international following, with permanent installations in Europe, Asia, North America, South America, Africa, the United Arab Emirates and the Caribbean. Ramersdorfer works in marble and granite, often in combination with steel, using light and space to create physical and spiritual interiors.

== Education ==
Ramersdorfer studied philosophy in Paris in 1979 before enrolling in the International University of Art in Florence, Italy, where she studied African art history, museum science, and Renaissance fresco restoration. At the same time, she studied etching for two years at the graphic art studio of the Santa Reparata International School of Art in Florence. She entered the sculpture department at the Academy of Fine Arts in Carrara, Italy, in 1983, receiving her MFA in 1988.

== Career ==
After completing her studies, Ramersdorfer’s career took off, thanks in part to grants from the Austrian Ministry of Education and the Arts and Culture and the Federal Chancellery in Vienna to work abroad, most notably in Japan in the early 1990s where she studied the culture and developed and exhibited new work. It was there that she "absorbed the notion of balance, both mental and structural. There she also learned to be true to her materials, and that all matter has an animus that animates it." A grant from UNESCO supported the Carambolage Project, a 1998 exchange with artists of the Caribbean.

In 1995 she returned to Austria where she established studios in Vienna, and in Vorarlberg, in the home/office designed by her father, the architect Mag. Willi F. Ramersdorfer (1922-2010). Over the next few years, she worked in both Asia and Europe on the Energy series, developing the Ring Project in Fukuoka, Japan, and the Inner View series in Vienna. Since then, she has participated in exhibitions worldwide and won commissions to create a number of large-scale, site-specific works at nearly two dozen international sculpture symposia. Her sculptures are installed in private and public art collections in Europe, Japan, Taiwan, Egypt, Canada, U.S.A., China, Belize, Abu Dhabi and Dubai, United Arab Emirates, where she was awarded first prize at the 2005 Emaar International Art Symposium for Inner View.

The Inner View series, an exploration of spiritual interiors as expressed through sculpture, has been the focus of her work for over a decade. Seed of Unified Spirit, a piece from the series, was selected for inclusion in the Olympic Garden for the 2008 summer games. It has been permanently installed there, facing the Linglong Tower. In 2011 Inner View–Open was selected for installation in the Campus Sculpture Park for the Centennial of Tsinghua University, Beijing.

In early 2009 Ramersdorfer was one of 17 artists (and the only woman) participating in the Abu Dhabi International Sculpture Symposium. She produced a 15-ton sculpture in white marble, which took five weeks to create.

After spending summers in the Adirondack Region of upstate New York, Ramersdorfer became a permanent resident of the US in 2009 and has a studio in Wells, New York.

== Themes ==
Ramersdorfer’s early work consisted of “combinations of rusty steel and granite characterized by a terrestrial, heavy gravitation.” These were seen as “a metaphorical expression of contemporary life and existence...”

As an emerging artist, Ramersdorfer made several trips to Japan at the invitation of the Reimei no oka International Sculpture Symposium in Kyushu, and the International Sculpture Symposium, Mura-oka-Cho/Hyogo Ken, and with the help of a grant from the Austrian Ministry of Education and the Arts and Culture she was able to stay on. Thus began a period of artistic growth as Ramersdorfer traveled between Asia and Europe. Upon her return to Japan in 1995, her work took on a lighter quality when she began a new series that integrated bamboo columns into stone sculptures. These sculptures were “loose, weightless, elegant… symbolizing steps towards a higher cognition and eternal youth.”

This trend continued over the next decade, enhanced by the addition of light as a sculptural element in her pieces. In the series Light (1997-1998), Ramersdorfer excavated “a defined space from natural rocks. Substituting the material with white neon light, Caroline Ramersdorfer visualizes a filtering of lines contrasting the full and void, the cubic and the structured layerings—making her sculptures seem to float and take off on a journey.”

In 2001, the Austrian Ministry of Art and Education supported a multimedia project, Inner Views, initiating a series of marble sculptures that continues to the present. The concept behind Inner Views, is to set free sculptural detail views from the inside of a form. In the series, "she has focused on turning white marble inside out by using light, texture and grinding." In these sculptures, Ramersdorfer analyzes multiple square marble slabs then recomposes them to reveal complex interior spaces populated with carved out columns and ridges. As in her earlier work, light is used as a sculptural element to transform a physical interior into something ethereal. The sculptures range in size from small scale to monumental, site-specific works.

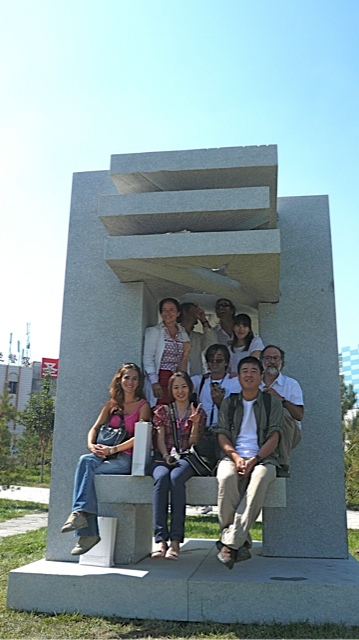
Int.Friendship Sculpture Park Urumqi China 2009

Ramersdorfer sees the viewer as an integral part of her sculptures, and they are considered in her design from the beginning, especially in how she integrates light into her pieces. Smaller scale works are assembled in metal stands or hung in such a way as to reflect and capture the light. In her large-scale work, the viewer can enter the piece and experience the play of light, observing how this transforms a sculptural interior into a spiritual one.

The effect is described in the essay by Albert Ruetz in the catalogue accompanying the Cairo Biennial XII. “Light and the passage of time turn the delicate lattices into translucent assemblies that are constantly created anew, evoking a most varied range of emotions. In this way, the sensed three-dimensionality of the sculpture is augmented by the additional dimension of discovery, in the material qualities of the marble and its many-layered construction. The crystalline nature of the material is transformed by shifting light into amorphous formations which appear to breathe, acquiring a life and vitality of their own.”

Symbolism is important in Ramersdorfer’s work, as evident in the Inner Views series. As the series progressed, Ramersdorfer began to see the inner carvings as representing an interior world both physical and spiritual, something she called an architecture of the soul.

Cross-cultural understanding is another important theme in her work, through which she tries to bridge cultures to increase tolerance and understanding. "I see being a sculptor as an active process in creating a union and finding intersecting points between art, world cultures and their decisive human factor."

Seed of Unified Spirit, completed in 2008, took a global perspective, with seven marble slabs representing the different continents and poles, reflecting the Olympic park theme of “One World–One Dream.” Inner View Interlocked (2009), a commission from the Xinjiang International Urban Sculpture Symposium in Urumqi, China, to commemorate sixty years of the People‘s Republic of China, also embraced the idea of bridging cultures, ethnicities and human experience.

Since moving to the Adirondacks, Ramersdorfer has referenced her rural environment. Her work has shifted, breaking through the “rigid angularity of her earlier work into more expressive abstractions.” Her changing environment has duality in the physical environment. She uses nature as a guide, the new works reference a fluidness and unpredictability that is more evocative than the older works that precisely fit together like the specifications of a building, or a math equation.”

Indicators, the centerpiece of her first solo exhibition since moving to the Adirondacks, “Concept Alters Reality” at the John Davis Gallery, exemplified this new direction. “Gone are the volumes of marble; what’s left is a distilled abstraction bursting forth with energy, rather than the cool, calculating forms she has constructed on five continents. Other newer examples, like Inner View-Open 1 and Open Inner View, exhibited at the C. Grimaldis Gallery in Baltimore, shatter their frames as chards of marble—like broken glass or melting ice—stick out like spikes.”

== Gallery ==
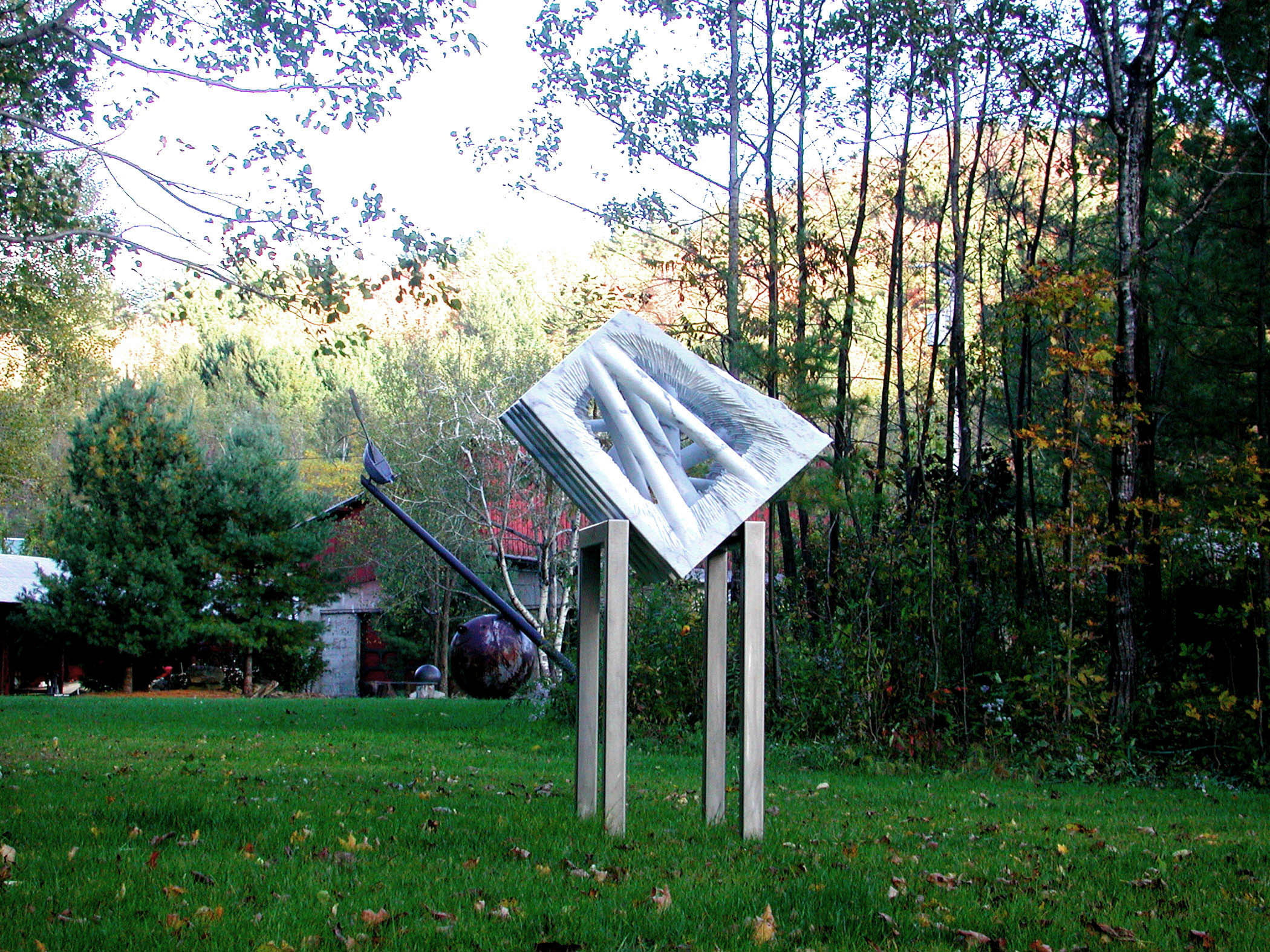
Inner View, Vermont marble and Stainless steel, 8'h x4'w x4'd

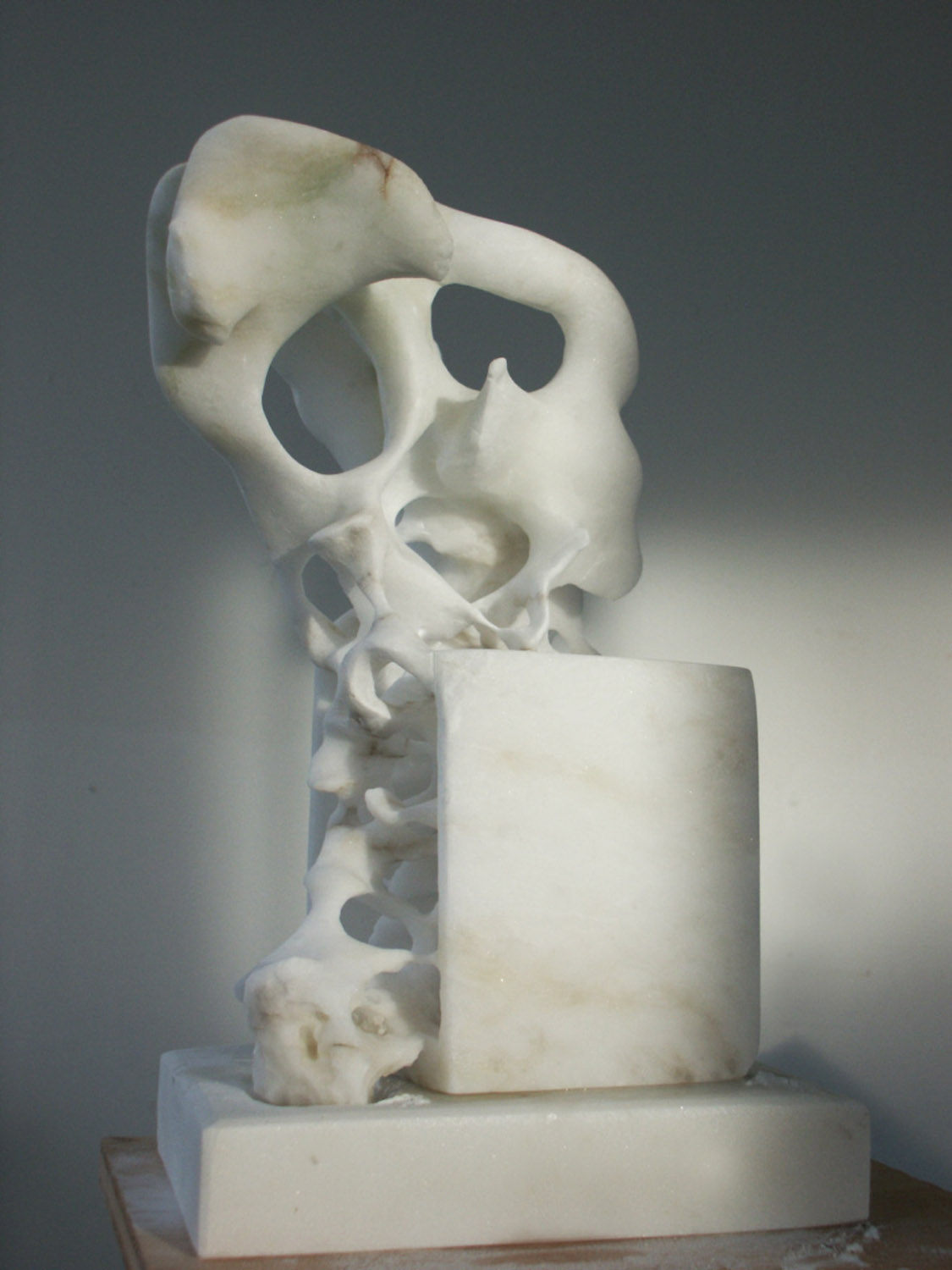
09Inner View to the Bone, marble, 18"h x8"w x6'd

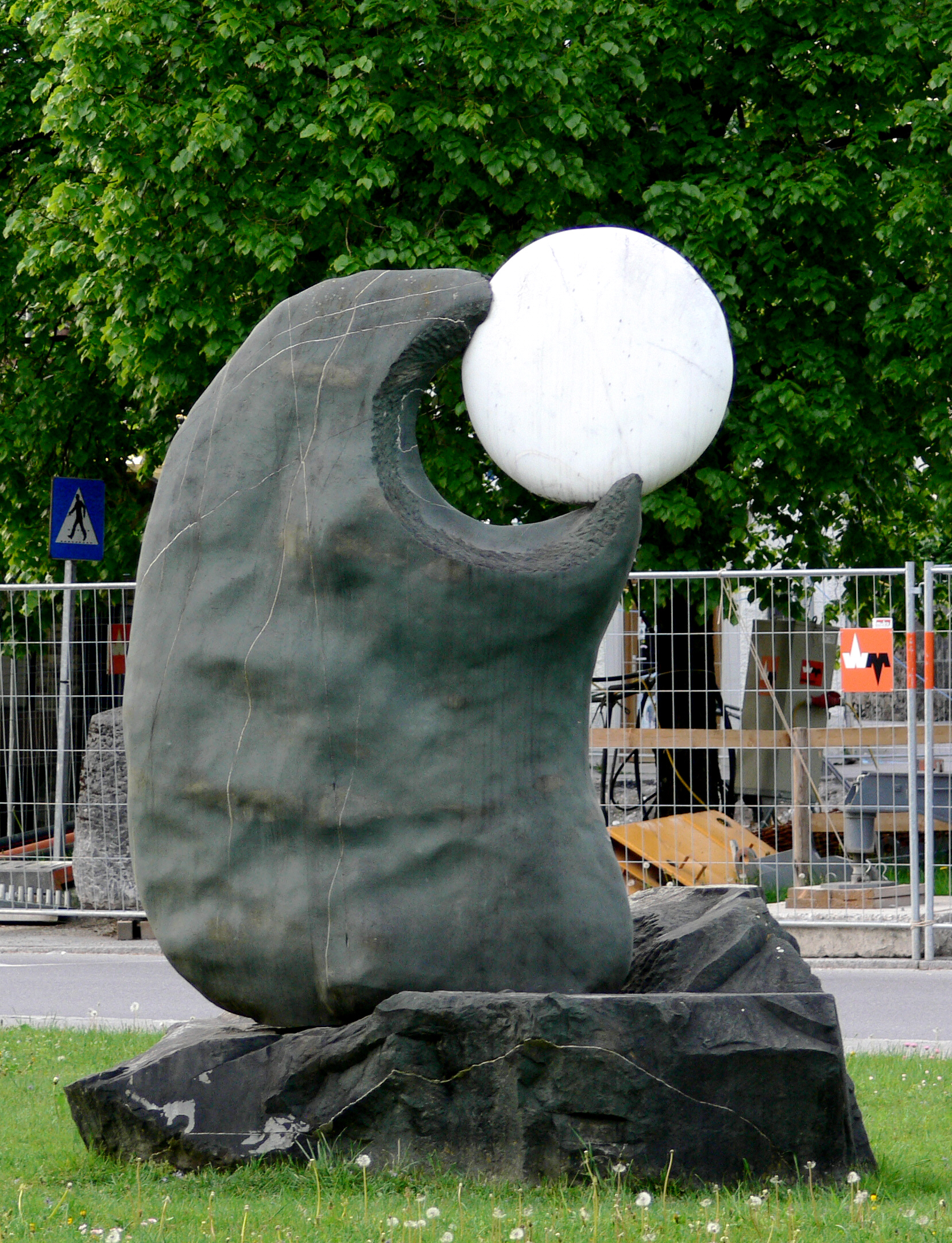
Hohenems Skulptur

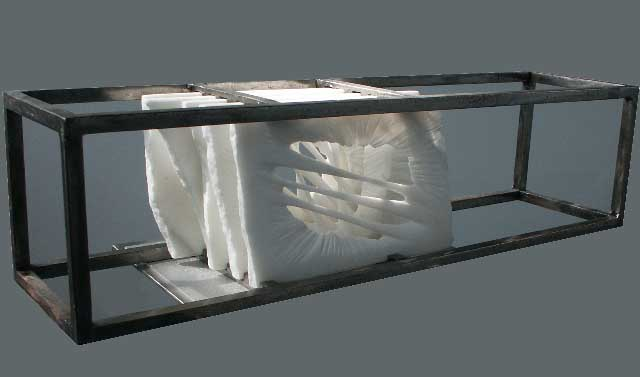
Layers Light Sight 2000, marble, steel, 6"h x20"w x6'd

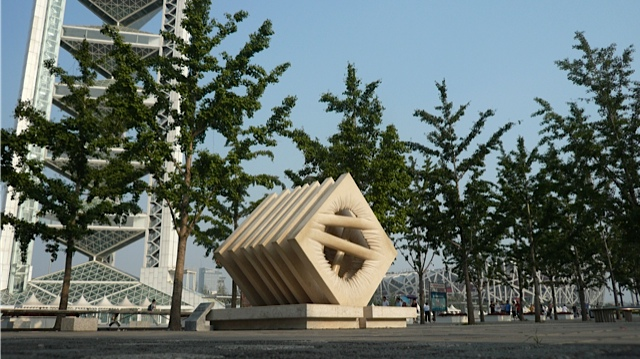
Seed of a Unified Spirit, Beijing Olympic Green 2008

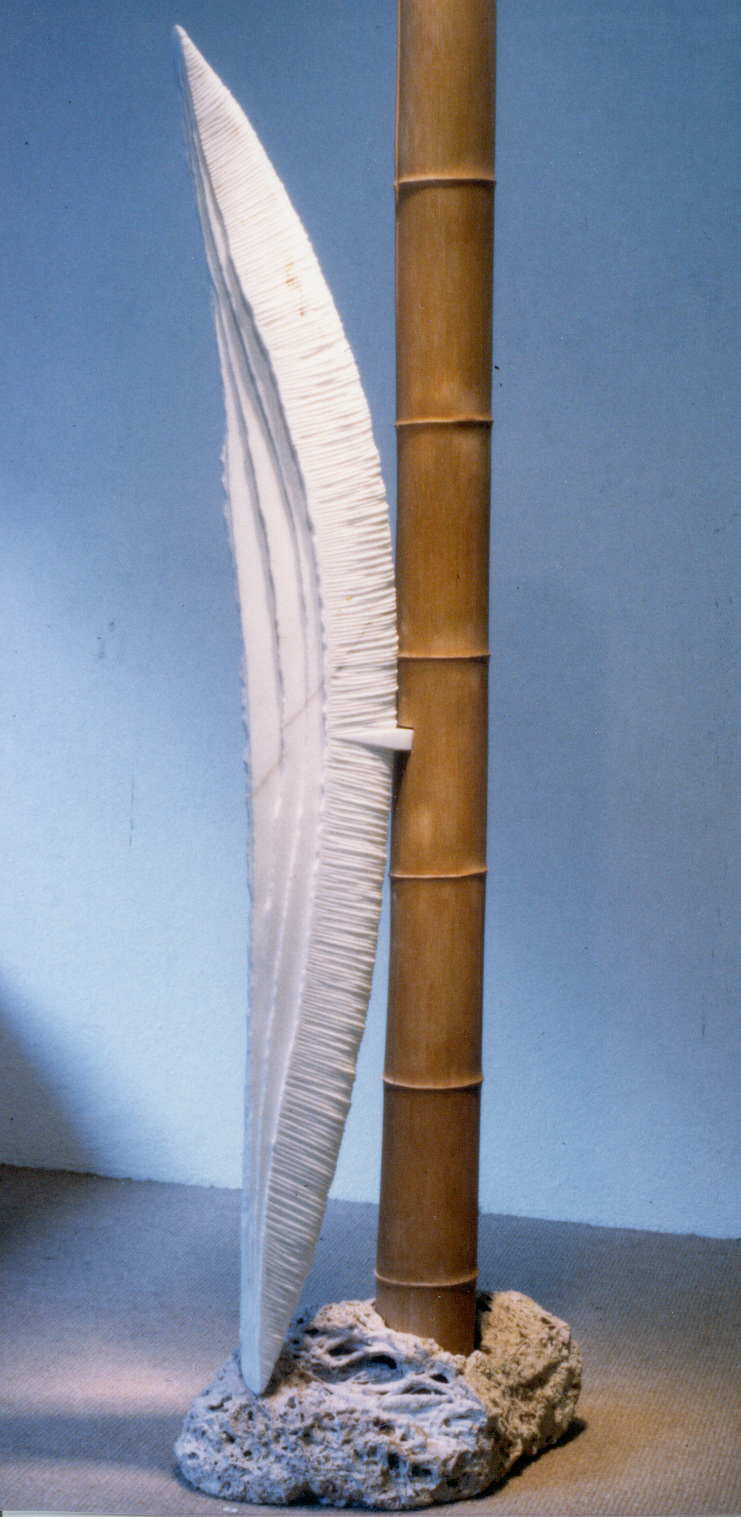
materials: marble, bamboo, limestone. 7'h x 2'w x 2'w

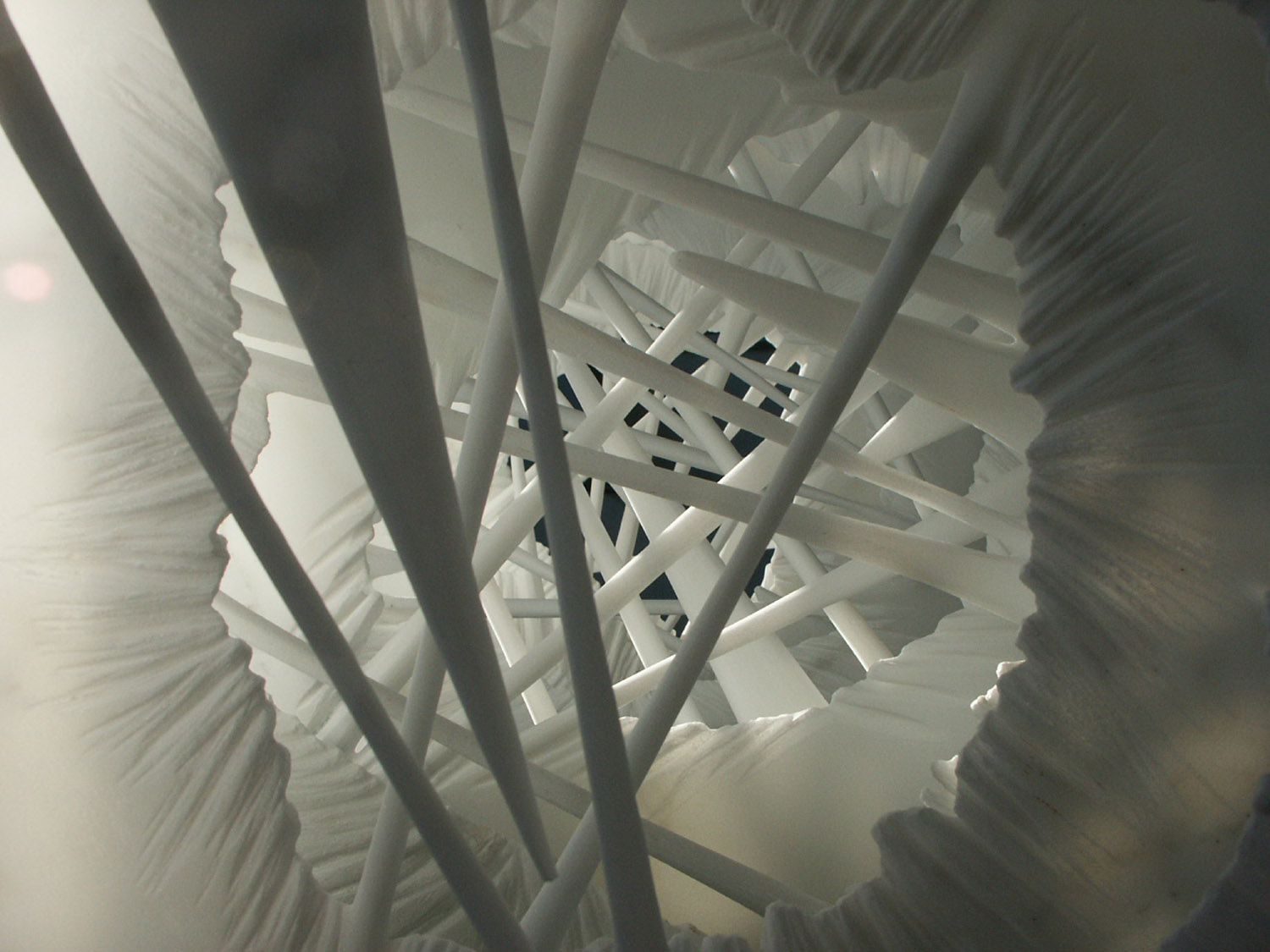
Inrrer View (detail)

== In film ==
In 2012 Ramersdorfer was the subject of a documentary film, Caroline’s Rock, by Canadian filmmaker Jim Elderton. Ramersdorfer was recorded as she dealt with problems funding and installing a large sculpture in Vernon, British Columbia.

== Awards ==
- Golden award, 2006, Renaissance & Rising International City of Sculpture and Cultural Year in Zhengzhou, China.
- Merit award at the international maquette show of project proposals to be permanently installed in the 2008 Beijing Olympic Park.

== Galleries ==
- C. Grimaldis Gallery, Baltimore
- C. Fine Art, New York City
- Galerie Fellner von Feldegg, Krefeld, Germany
- Salwa Zeidan Gallery, Abu Dhabi.
- Allyn Gallup Gallery, Sarasota, Florida

== Permanent installations and collections ==
- Dornbirn, Austria
- Hohenems, Austria
- Shimada Art Museum, Kumamoto, Japan
- Yufuin Art Museum, Yufuin, Japan
- Vorarlberg County Museum, Bregenz, Austria
- Eda Garden Museum, Yokohama, Tokyo, Japan
- 5 Ringstone project, Fukuoka, Japan
- Federal Chancellery Artothek, City of Vienna, Austria
- Culture Department, City of Vienna, Austria
- Vernon District Performing Art Centre, Vernon, B.C., Canada
- RAIBA Bank Art Collection, Bregenz, Austria
- Hualien County Cultural Museum, City of Zhengzhou, China
- Beijing Olympic Park, Beijing, China
- International Friendship Sculpture Park, Ordos City, Inner Mongolia, China
- Harmonious Development Sculpture Park, Urumqi City, China
- ADISS: Bridging Society through the Language of Art, Abu Dhabi
- Campus Sculpture Park, Tsinghua University, Beijing, China
- Belize City
- Robert T. Webb Sculpture Garden of the Creative Arts Guild, North Georgia (February 2011)
