= C. Grimaldis Gallery =

Art gallery in Baltimore, Maryland, US

Coordinates: 39°17′45.4″N 76°36′55.6″W

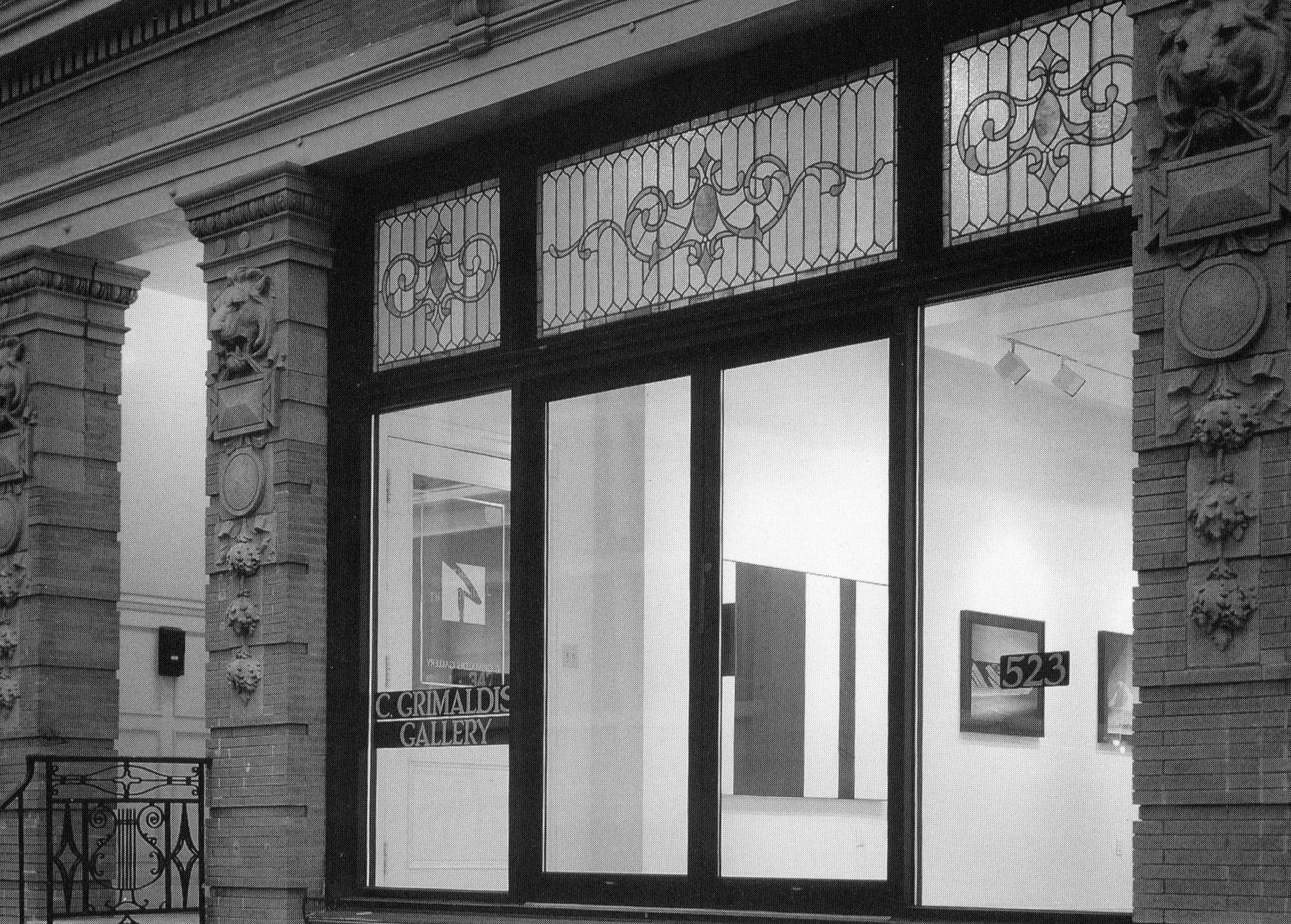
C. Grimaldis Gallery, 523 N Charles Street, 1997

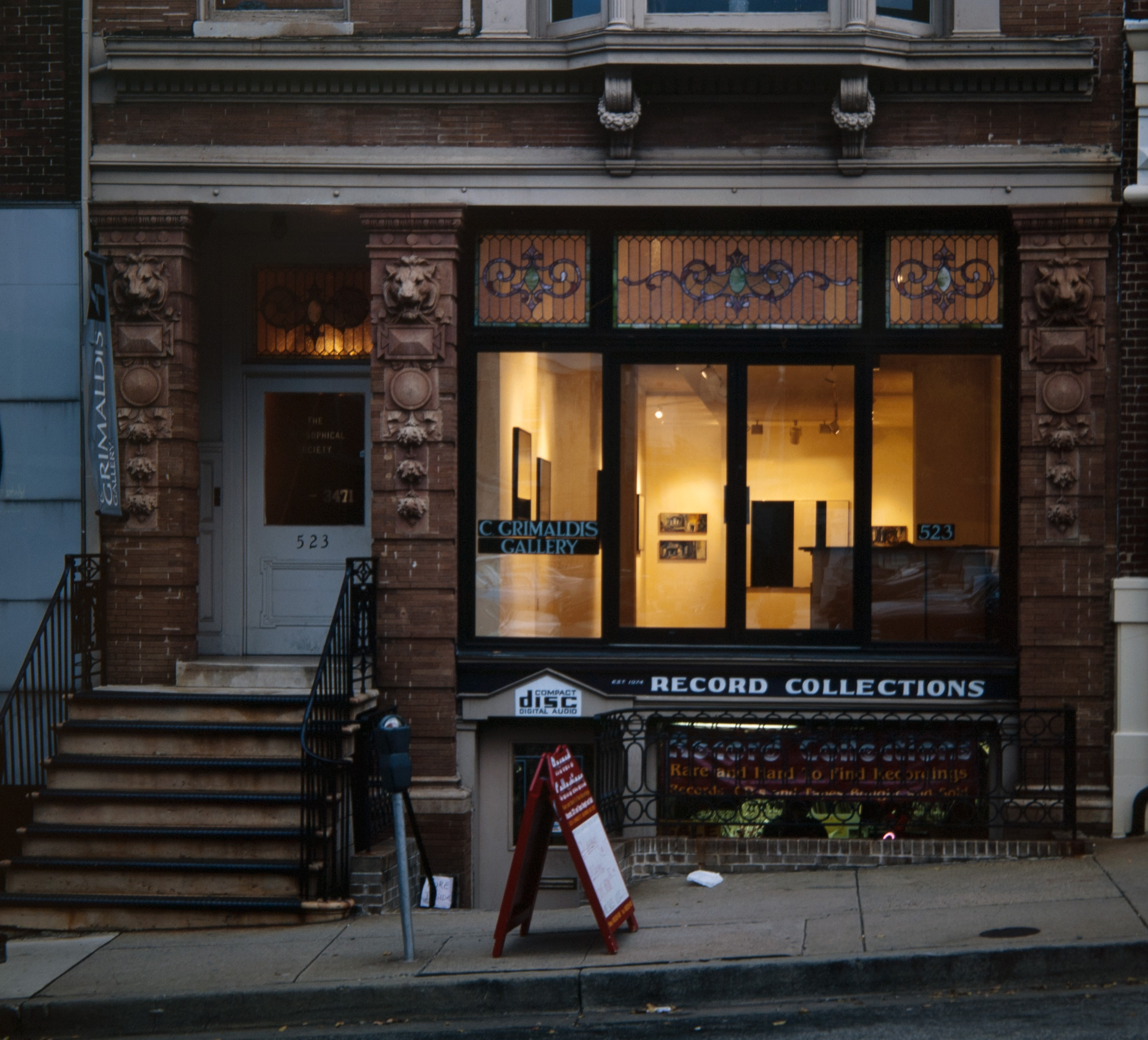
C. Grimaldis Gallery, 523 N. Charles Street

The C. Grimaldis Gallery is a contemporary and modern art gallery established in 1977 by Constantine Grimaldis. It is the longest continually operating gallery in Baltimore, Maryland. The gallery specializes in post-WWII American and European art with an emphasis on contemporary sculpture. In addition to representing approximately 40 nationally and internationally established artists, the gallery is responsible for the estates of Grace Hartigan and Eugene Leake. The gallery has been responsible for hundreds of important solo and group exhibitions that have launched and sustained the careers of many artists from the United States and abroad.

"Grimaldis began in 1977 by exhibiting mostly artists with a regional reputation, but gradually added major New York names to the roster and made his gallery one always worth following." Noteworthy artists to have exhibited at C. Grimaldis Gallery include John Baldessari, Sir Anthony Caro, Elaine de Kooning, Willem de Kooning, Grace Hartigan, Hans Hoffman, Beverly McIver, Alice Neel, Robert Rauschenberg, Richard Serra, Joel Shapiro, John Van Alstine and John Waters.

The gallery produces scholarly catalogues and public programing in support of select exhibitions. Public programming consists of artists talks and expert lectures on current exhibitions which are free and open to the public in the gallery space. In addition to gallery exhibitions and events, C. Grimaldis Gallery participates in an average of six national and international art fairs annually. For over 14 years C. Grimaldis Gallery has participated in various art fairs including Art Miami, Palm Beach 3, Art Chicago, Art Athina and the Houston Fine Art Fair.

== History ==
On September 29, 1977 the inaugural C. Grimaldis Gallery opening reception was held for an exhibition of prints by Mavis Pusey and sculptures by Stephanie Scuris. At this time the gallery was located at 928 North Charles Street. The Baltimore Chronicle described the space as a "...well-proportioned, ornate, high-ceilinged gallery, painted white 'to let the art speak.'"

Starting in the late 1970s and into the late 1980s C. Grimaldis Gallery was among several art galleries on Charles Street in Baltimore City including G.H. Dalsheimer Gallery, Meredith Gallery, B.R. Kornblatt Gallery, Purnell Galleries and George Ciscle Gallery. Sharon Dickman wrote in The Evening Sun Accent, "From Saratoga to Chase streets, the Charles street galleries can be penciled in, block after block, like Cézanne bathers standing at the water's edge." Today, C. Grimaldis Gallery is the only gallery, from this group, that remains. Having thrived during the 1970s, 1980s and remaining as an influential voice in the local and national community solidifies the C. Grimaldis Gallery's place in Baltimore art history.

In 1979 the gallery exhibited paintings by the abstract expressionist painter Grace Hartigan. "Paintings Of The Seventies" was her first solo exhibition in Baltimore. She continued on to have a solo exhibition at The Baltimore Museum of Art the following year. In a feature article in The Baltimore Sun Sunday Magazine Cherrill Anson wrote, "The most celebrated woman painter in the United States today, Miss Hartigan has made her studio in a four-story former rag factory a block from the waterfront for two years—ever since she married the Johns Hopkins scientist Dr. Winston H. Price and moved to Baltimore from New York." In a 1979 Baltimore Sun article the artist said, "I like Costas [Constantine Grimaldis]. He's committed to this city, and he is efficient and on time. I think there are young people of talent here too. I dislike the reverse provincialism of not liking artists in your own city. New York in the late 1940s was like Baltimore is now." The C. Grimaldis Gallery remains Grace Hartigan's primary representation since the beginning of their relationship in 1979 and has continued as the executor of her estate since 2008. From 1965 until 2008 Hartigan was the Chair of the Hoffberger School of Painting at the Maryland Institute College of Art.

"Alice Neel '81: A Retrospective, 1926–1981," in 1981 was an important exhibition in the history of the C. Grimaldis Gallery and the first time Neel's paintings were exhibited in Baltimore, Maryland. It was soon followed by the 1983 solo exhibition of works by Alice Neel titled "Alice Neel: Five Decades of Painting".

In December 1985 the sculptures of Sir Anthony Caro first appeared in Baltimore at C. Grimaldis Gallery. A total of 11 sculptures by Caro, including his well-known "Table Pieces", were on display. The Baltimore Sun reported that "These smaller works resting on, and expanding horizontally and vertically from plain white stands rising to table height, have been compared to still-life paintings by old masters such as Chardin. One such work at Grimaldis is the outstanding "Rose Bloom," 1983, in lead and wood—a lyrical arrangement that suggest the patterns of overlapping petals without literally depicting a floral shape."

In the autumn of 1986 C. Grimaldis Gallery moved from 928 North Charles Street to its current location of 523 North Charles Street. The inaugural exhibition at this new location was "Grimaldis & Friends" in September 1986. This group show featured works by Sir Anthony Caro, Elaine de Kooning, Willem de Kooning, Grace Hartigan and Hans Hoffman. Regarding the work of Hans Hoffman, Bennard Perlman of The Baltimore Daily Record noted that "It is doubly appropriate that this painting by this giant among painters should be exhibited here, in Baltimore, for it not only serves to pay tribute to the gallery's new location but simultaneously to the late Adelyn Breeskin. It was Mrs. B., during her tenure as director of the Baltimore Museum of Art, who chose the work, among others, for inclusion in the 1960 Venice Biennale. Homage can be paid in both respects by having this canvas remain in the city." This exhibition included two works by Willem de Kooning and marked the first time he was exhibited in Baltimore, Maryland.

In the spring of 1990 Mr. Grimaldis opened an additional gallery called Sculpture Space located at 1006 Morton Street. The gallery measured 3,000 square feet and was capable of accommodating larger and heavier pieces than the 523 N Charles Street gallery. The first exhibition in Sculpture Space was a solo exhibition of sculptures by Jene Highstein. In 1993 Sculpture Space closed.

Another noteworthy exhibition at C. Grimaldis Gallery featured works on paper by the sculptors; Jene Highstein, Pello Irazu, Mel Kendrick, Ulrich Ruckriem, Richard Serra, Joel Shapiro, and John Van Alstine titled "Drawings By Sculptors" opened in January 1996 at the 523 N Charles Street location. This was the first exhibition of works by Richard Serra in Baltimore, Maryland.

Constantine Grimaldis first exhibited paintings by Beverly McIver in March 2003 in the solo exhibition "Mammy, I Love You," which received extensive critical acclaim. This is illustrated in Joe Shannon's response to the exhibition in Art in America, "McIver, a North Carolina native who is currently a Radcliffe fellow, has created a narrative project that is one of the most emotionally successful you will see, as pure painting and as a mirror on life." Soon thereafter, in 2004, The Baltimore Museum of Art acquired a painting by McIver titled "A Woman's Work." An award-winning documentary on Beverly McIver's life and work titled "Raising Renee" was created by West City Films and HBO in 2011. In December 2011 Beverly McIver was listed in Art in America's "2011's Top Ten in Painting" by Raphael Rubinstein.

The C. Grimaldis Gallery is the primary representation of Korean light artist Chul Hyun Ahn who is in the Borusan Contemporary, Marguiles Collection, Marvin and Elayne Mordes Collection, Washington D.C. Convention Center Collection, Delaware Art Museum, Hearst Foundation, Harn Museum, and Palm Springs Art Museum, among others. Chul Hyun Ahn first exhibited with the gallery in the winter of 2003 after Mr. Grimaldis saw Ahn's thesis work at the Maryland Institute College of Art where he earned an MFA in 2002. The 2003 exhibition was titled "Infinity – Emptiness" and featured six light sculptures. As Hilarie Sheets, contributing editor to ARTnews who also writes regularly for The New York Times, Art in America, and Art + Auction, described in a C. Grimaldis Gallery "Infinite Void" exhibition catalog:

Ahn is part of a younger generation of artists, including Olafur Eliasson, Ivan Navarro, Spencer Finch, and Leo Villareal, who use actual light as their primary medium because of its immediate experiential qualities and metaphoric richness. When Ahn has exhibited "Untitled (Double) I" (2009), a beaming square inside a larger square, viewers have actually made nose prints on the exterior one-way mirror as they have tried to see into the dark tunnel sloping downwards that opens up inside the center square. At once thrilling and ominous, it suggests a rabbit hole to another world—underwater, outer space, afterlife—or journey to the unknown, the kind of leap of faith involved in the artist's own passage to an unfamiliar country and language.

== Artists ==
Artists currently represented by the C. Grimaldis Gallery

- Chul Hyun Ahn
- Dovrat Amsily Barak
- David Brewster
- Anthony Caro
- Henry Coe
- Elaine deKooning
- Madeleine Dietz
- Joel Fisher
- Jose Manuel Fors
- Effie Halivopoulou
- Grace Hartigan (Estate)
- Jon Isherwood
- Hidenori Ishii
- Dimitra Lazaridou
- Eugene Leake (Estate)
- Sungmi Lee
- Kim Manfredi
- Jane Manus
- Beverly McIver
- Neil Meyerhoff
- Raoul Middleman
- Christopher Myers
- Caroline Ramersdorfer
- Leland Rice
- John Ruppert
- Christopher Saah
- Annette Sauermann
- Richard Serra
- Sofia Silva
- Rex Stevens
- Osami Tanaka
- Alexey Titarenko
- Rene Trevino
- John van Alstine
- Costas Varotsos
- Elizabeth Wade
- John Waters
- Lu Zhang
