= Chul Hyun Ahn =

South Korean artist

- Born: January 15, 1971 (age 54); Busan, South Korea
- Education: Maryland Institute College of Art, Chu-Gye University for the Arts
- Known for: Installation art, Sculpture, Light art
- Movement: Light art

- Chul Hyun Ahn
- Hangul: 안철현
- RR: An Cheolhyeon
- MR: An Ch'ŏrhyŏn

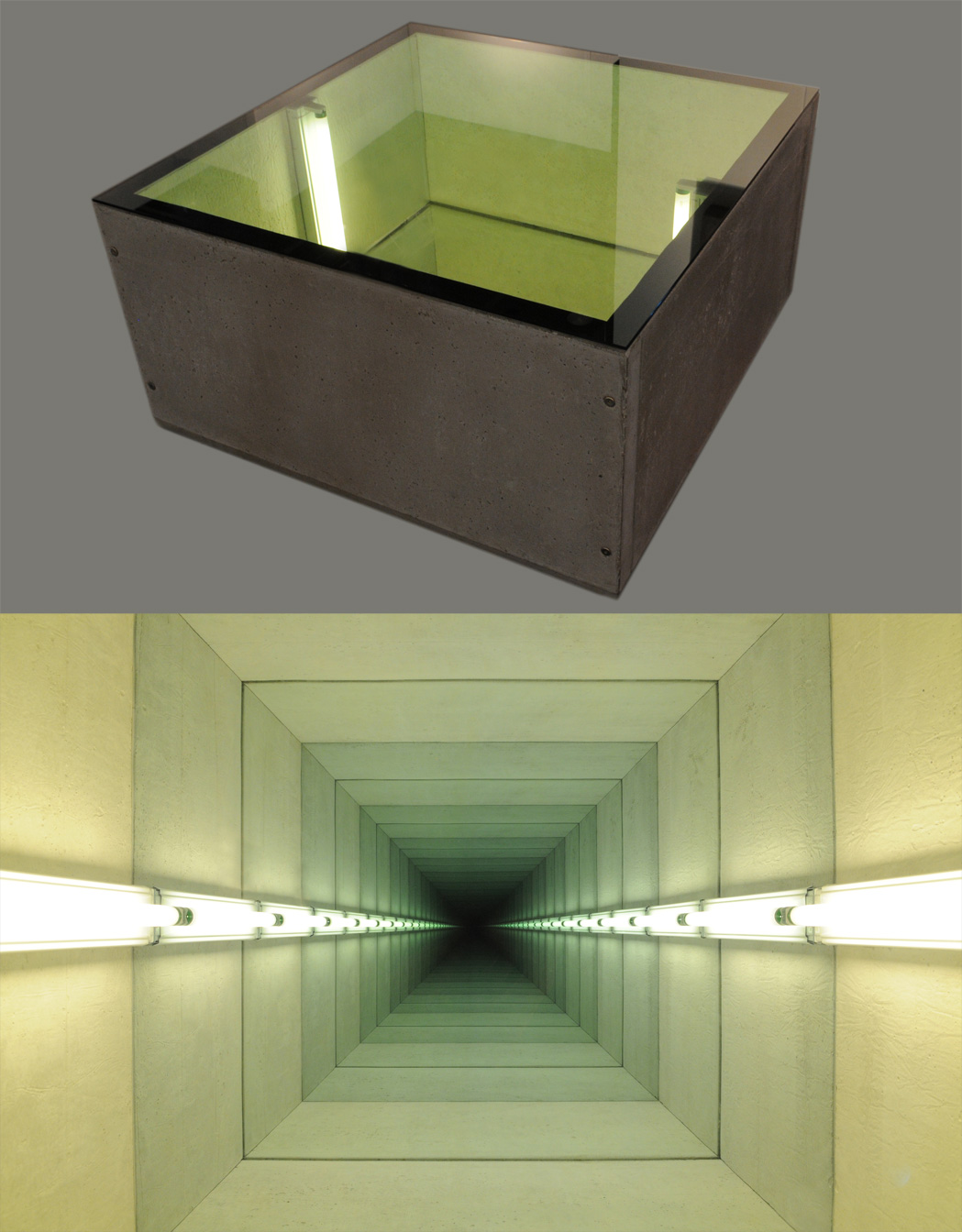
Chul Hyun Ahn, "Tunnel IV," 2011 (two views), cast concrete, lights, mirrors, ed. of 3, 20x40x40 inches

Chul Hyun Ahn (Korean: 안철현) is a South Korean artist who works primarily with light.

== Description ==
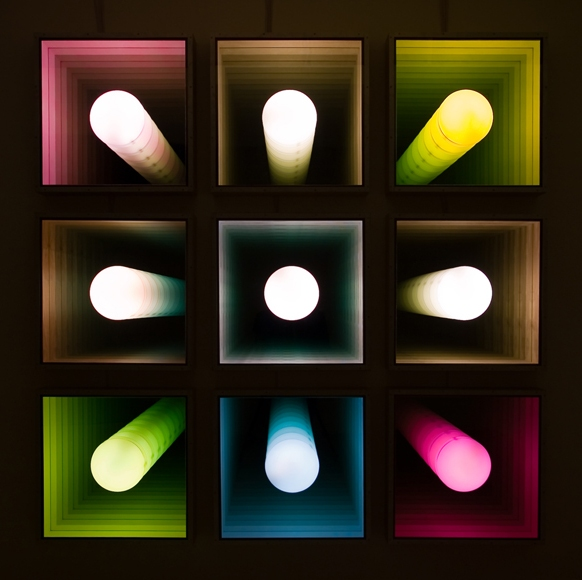
Chul Hyun Ahn, "Visual Echo Experiment," 2005, 9 pieces, 104 x 104 x 5.5 inches

Ahn is a member of a group of young light artists including Olafur Eliasson, Ivan Navarro, Spencer Finch, and Leo Villareal. Ahn creates meditations on zen notions of the infinite and the void, which distinguishes Ahn's oeuvre from other artists working with light. Ahn's multiple on-going sculpture series including "Forked Series" and "Tunnel Series" systematically explore the limitations of space and optics.

Hilarie M. Sheets, contributing editor of ARTnews who also writes regularly for The New York Times, Art in America, and Art + Auction, said his work is "At once thrilling and ominous, it suggests a rabbit hole to another world—underwater, outer space, afterlife—or journey to the unknown, the kind of leap of faith involved in the artist’s own passage to an unfamiliar country and language." As a pillar in the resurgence of light art, "Ahn creates sculptures utilizing light, color and illusion as physical representations of his investigation of infinite space."

Ahn lives and works in Baltimore, Maryland, where he is represented by C. Grimaldis Gallery.

== Biography ==
Chul Hyun Ahn was born in Busan, South Korea. He received a Bachelor of Fine Arts from the Chugye University for the Arts in Seoul. In 1997 he moved to the United States and received a Master of Fine Arts from the Mount Royal School at the Maryland Institute College of Art in Baltimore in 2002.

Mr. Grimaldis first saw Ahn's work at his 2002 MFA thesis exhibition at the Maryland Institute College of Art. Soon after, he had his first exhibition with C. Grimaldis Gallery in the winter of 2003 in a solo exhibition titled Infinity - Emptiness which featured six light sculptures. Since 2003 Chul Hyun Ahn has exhibited extensively nationally and internationally, and his work can be found in numerous important private and public collections.

In a review of Ahn's 2008 C. Grimaldis Gallery solo exhibition, Phenomena: Visual Echo art critic Cara Ober wrote: "What does infinity look like? Chul Hyun Ahn's show of thirteen mirrored light boxes (all 2008) answered this question over and over, in subtly different ways. The constructions of plywood and fluorescent light with exposed electrical cords unavoidably recall Donald Judd and Dan Flavin, but Ahn uses these industrial materials to a different end. Rather than clarifying visual phenomena without artifice, Ahn seeks to mystify."

== Selected exhibitions ==
2011

- C. Grimaldis Gallery, Baltimore, Maryland, Illuminated Void (solo)
- Galerie Paris-Beijing, Paris, France, Visual Echo (solo)
- Kunstraum: Morgenstrabe, Karlsruhe, Germany, Touching The Void
- Delaware Art Museum, Wilmington, Delaware, Perception/Deception: Illusion In Contemporary Art

2010

- Southeastern Center for Contemporary Art, Winston-Salem, North Carolina, Look Again, Curator: Steven Matijcio

2009

- C. Grimaldis Gallery, Baltimore, Maryland, A Sculpture Show

2008

- Samuel P. Harn Museum of Art, University of Florida, Gainesville, Florida, Momentum: Contemporary Art From The Harn Collection
- C. Grimaldis Gallery, Baltimore, Maryland, Phenomena: Visual Echo (solo)

2007

- C. Grimaldis Gallery, Baltimore, Maryland, New Work (solo)
- Decker Gallery, Maryland Institute College of Art, Baltimore, Maryland, Jane & Walter Sondheim Semi-Finalist Exhibition

2006

- CPS Gallery, New York, New York
- School 33, Baltimore, Maryland, Biennial Exhibition

2005

- C. Grimaldis Gallery, Baltimore, Maryland, Visual Echoes (solo)
- Conner Contemporary, Washington, D.C., New Work (solo)
- The Shore Institute of the Contemporary Arts, Long Branch, New Jersey, Luminous Recurrence

2004

- C. Grimaldis Gallery, Baltimore, Maryland, Infinite Directions (solo)

2003

- C. Grimaldis Gallery, Baltimore, Maryland, Infinity - Emptiness (solo)

2002

- Conner Contemporary, Washington, D.C., Academy 2002
- CAA Conference, Philadelphia, Pennsylvania, Six Degrees In Cold Storage

2001

- Gallery Four, Baltimore, Maryland, Multiplicity

1999

- Creole Gallery, Lansing, Michigan

1996

- Kyung-In Art Museum, Seoul, South Korea, New Frontier Exhibition
- City Museum of Art, Seoul, South Korea, The Joong-Ang Biennale
- National Museum of Contemporary Art, Seoul, South Korea, The 15th Grand Art Exhibition of Korea

== Selected collections ==
- American Society of Nephrology, Washington, DC
- Baltimore Office of Promotion and the Arts, Baltimore, Maryland
- Borusan Contemporary, Istanbul, Turkey
- Delaware Art Museum, Wilmington, Delaware
- Hearst Foundation Collection, New York, New York
- Marguiles Collection at the Warehouse, Miami, Florida
- Marvin and Elayne Mordes Collection, West Palm Beach, Florida
- McDonald's Corporation, Washington, DC
- Jordon D. Schnitzer Family Foundation, Portland, Oregon
- Palm Springs Art Museum, Palm Springs, California
- Samuel P. Harn Museum of Art, University of Florida, Gainesville, Florida
- Washington D.C. Convention Center, Washington, DC
- Carre de Malberg Private Collection, Paris, France

== Suggested reading ==
- Adams, Virginia k., & Sheets, Hilarie M., "Chul Hyun Ahn: Illuminated Void" (Baltimore, C. Grimaldis Gallery, 2011).
