= Reparata =

Reparata can refer to:

== People ==
- Saint Reparata, Christian martyr

== Places ==
- Santa Reparata, Florence, church in Florence
- Santa-Reparata-di-Balagna, town in Corsica
- Santa-Reparata-di-Moriani, town in Corsica

== Music ==
- Reparata and the Delrons, musical group

== See also ==
- Santa Reparata International School of Art
