= Morgan O'Hara =

American conceptual artist

- Born: 1941 (age 84–85)
- Occupation: Conceptual artist
- Website: morganohara.art

Morgan O'Hara (born 1941 in New York), is a conceptual artist based in Venice who works in performative drawing (Live Transmission) and social practice.

She was the recipient of fellowships from the Pollock-Krasner Foundation, Gottlieb Foundation, and Artists Fellowship Inc and The Pollock-Krasner Foundation's Lee Krasner Lifetime Achievement Award, which was awarded in 2017.

Her work is represented in public collections, including the National Gallery of Art, Washington, DC; the Hammer Museum, Los Angeles, California; the British Museum, London, UK; the Metropolitan Museum of Art, New York, NY; Kupferstichkabinett Berlin, Germany; Stedelijk Museum, Amsterdam; Cranbrook Art Museum, Detroit, Michigan; the Arkansas Arts Center, Little Rock, Arkansas; Weatherspoon Gallery, Greensboro, North Carolina; the Hood Museum of Art, Hanover, New Hampshire; the Czech National Gallery, Prague; Moravska Galerie, Brno, Czech Republic; and Macau Art Museum, Macau, China.

Her permanent site-specific wall drawings can be found in Macau, China (2); Kobe, Japan (9), and Amsterdam, the Netherlands.

Publications include seven volumes of LIVE TRANSMISSION drawings.
