= Ra'anan Levy =

French-Israeli artist (1954–2022)

- רענן לוי
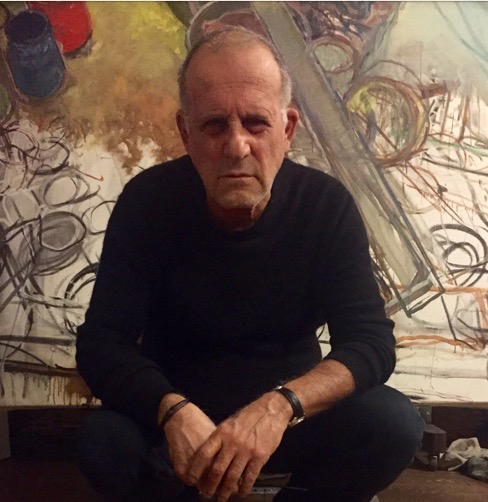
- Levy in 2017
- Born: 1 March 1954; Jerusalem, Israel
- Died: 2 June 2022 (aged 68); Paris, France
- Education: Accademia di Belle Arti di Roma; Accademia di Belle Arti di Firenze; Santa Reparata International School of Art; Hebrew University of Jerusalem
- Occupation: Artist
- Children: Yair Levy; Uri Levy; Emil Rose-Levy
- Parents: Raphaël Levy (father); Rina Sasson (mother)
- Website: https://www.raananlevy.com/

Ra'anan Levy (Hebrew: רענן לוי; 1 March 1954 – 2 June 2022) was a French-Israeli artist.

== Biography ==
Born into a Syrian Jewish family, Levy's grandfather worked as a newspaper manager in Damascus. Following the Yom Kippur War, Levy was released from his military service. From 1975 to 1979, he was enrolled at the Accademia di Belle Arti di Roma and subsequently the Accademia di Belle Arti di Firenze. At the same time, he was also enrolled in the Santa Reparata International School of Art in Florence. From 1980 to 1982, he studied history at the Hebrew University of Jerusalem, and from 1982 to 1984 was a resident of the Rijksakademie van beeldende kunsten. In 1987, he obtained a scholarship from the Fondation de France and moved to Paris.

In 2006, the Musée Maillol organized the first retrospective dedicated to Levy's works, which was exhibited at numerous museums around the world, including the Tel Aviv Museum of Art, the Russian Museum, and the Janos Gat Gallery.

Ra'anan Levy died in Paris on 2 June 2022 at the age of 68.
