= Adolph and Esther Gottlieb Foundation =

American nonprofit organization

The Adolph and Esther Gottlieb Foundation was established in 1976. It is an American nonprofit organization that provides funding for the arts.

== History ==
The Gottlieb Foundation was established after Adolph Gottlieb’s death in 1974. Esther Gottlieb, his widow, was the founder and president of the foundation. She set up the foundation in 1976 at the bequest of her husband according to provisions in his will with assets of some $6 million derived from the sale of his works. During his lifetime, Gottlieb was very generous to other artists and often provided loans to artists during times of crisis and need. He became acutely aware of artists’ needs, especially during times of emergency. It was Gottlieb's wish that his legacy of giving to fellow artists was continued after his death. Esther Gottlieb died in 1988 at the age of eighty-one. Sandford Hirsch is currently executive director of the foundation.

== Activities ==
The foundation offers grants to painters, sculptors and printmakers through two programmes: an annual Individual Support Grant and a separate programme to assist visual artists in cases of catastrophic events. The Individual Support Grant has a fixed annual deadline: "The Foundation wishes to encourage artists who have dedicated their lives to developing their art, regardless of their level of commercial success. This program was conceived in order to recognize and support the serious, fully-committed artist". Twelve of these grants are awarded each year. The Emergency Grant application has no fixed deadline.

The foundation also maintains an archive on the art and life of Adolph Gottlieb and organizes exhibitions of his work.

== Grant recipients ==
- Seymour Boardman
- Carole Caroompas
- Cora Cohen
- Clyde Connell
- Stefan Eins
- Louise Fishman
- Harmony Hammond
- Wally Hedrick
- Frank Holliday
- Theodora Varnay Jones
- Nabil Kanso
- John Kindness
- Wlodzimierz Ksiazek
- Pat Lipsky
- Knox Martin
- Allan McCollum
- George Earl Ortman
- Randall Schmit
- Chrysanne Stathacos
- Carol Sutton
- Anne Tabachnick
- Julie Umerle
- John Van Alstine
- Carol Wax
- Marjorie Welish
- Thornton Willis
- Isaac Witkin
- Larry Zox
- Suzan Frecon
- Morgan O'Hara
