= John Van Alstine =

American sculptor

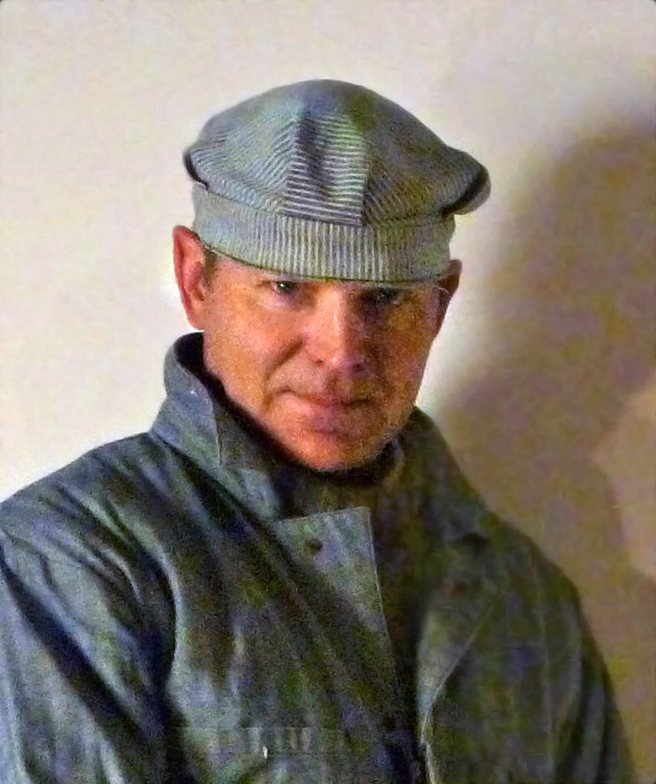
- Van Alstine in 2012
- Born: August 14, 1952 (age 73); Gloversville, New York
- Education: Cornell University, Kent State University, St. Lawrence University
- Known for: Sculpture
- Notable work: Smithsonian American Art Museum, Hirshhorn Museum and Sculpture Garden, Corcoran Gallery of Art
- Awards: Pollock-Krasner Foundation Fellowship, Gottlieb Foundation Fellowship, National Endowment for the Arts Fellowship
- Website: johnvanalstine.com

John Van Alstine (born August 14, 1952) is an American contemporary art sculptor and former assistant professor of fine arts at the University of Wyoming in Laramie and the University of Maryland in College Park where he taught drawing and sculpture. He primarily creates abstract stone and metal sculptures. His work has been exhibited in museums and galleries throughout the United States, as well as Europe and Asia.

== Personal life and education ==
John Van Alstine was born in 1952 in Gloversville, New York and raised in the Adirondack region of the state. He attended St. Lawrence University in 1970–1971. In 1973, he received a scholarship to attend the Blossom Festival School in Cleveland/Kent, Ohio, where he studied sculpture with Richard Stankiewicz and Richard Hunt. In 1974, he earned a Bachelor of Fine Arts degree from Kent State University. In 1976, he earned a Master of Fine Arts from Cornell University.

== Professional background ==
=== Academia ===
In 1976, Van Alstine was hired as an assistant professor at the University of Wyoming in Laramie, where he taught drawing and sculpture through 1980. He moved to Washington, D.C. and joined the faculty of the University of Maryland in College Park in 1980, where he taught in the art department through 1986.

In 1986 he left teaching and moved to the New York City area to pursue studio work full-time. The following year he purchased a 19th-century industrial complex on the banks of the Sacandaga River and in 1991 returned to the Adirondacks, where he works in the restored historic structure. He continues to give lectures on his work at colleges and universities, throughout the United States and abroad.

As of 2013, Van Alstine lives in Wells, New York, alongside the Sacandaga River.

=== Awards ===
Van Alstine has been awarded fellowships, grants and citations from the Pollock-Krasner Foundation, Adolph and Esther Gottlieb Foundation, National Endowment for the Arts, the Yaddo Fellowship, The Louis Comfort Tiffany Foundation, New Jersey Council of the Arts, and the Merit Award in Beijing for his construction of a large-scale public sculpture in the Olympic Park Garden.

=== Artistic works ===
Sculpture

Van Alstine works primarily with granite and steel mediums in a large scale format. He is known for stone and metal abstract sculptures exhibiting exceptional balance and poise. The works are often multilevel with references to the figure, classical, nautical, celestial and western mythological themes. Stone is used in an assemblage method, the way a welder uses steel, rather than in the traditional manner of subtraction. His work has touched on themes of Greek mythology, specifically the myth of Sisyphus. In 2008, Van Alstine was one of 50 artists to have his work chosen to be display at the 2008 Summer Olympics. The piece displayed, Rings of Unity – Circles of Inclusion, was based on the Sisyphus myth, consisting of a large piece of stone suspended in the middle of a 16-foot ring made of bronze. The piece took two weeks to create in a foundry. As of 2008, Van Alstine was represented by David Floria Gallery in Aspen, Colorado. Prominent solo gallery exhibitions have included Gerald Peters in Santa Fe, New Mexico; Nohra Haime in New York City; and C. Grimaldis Gallery in Baltimore, Maryland.

Public Works

Towards the Heavens – Large Scale and Broad Reaching
Beginning in 1986 while continuing to work on human scale work in his studio, Van Alstine embarked on the first in a series of "Celestial" works where he combined the character of large-scale contemporary sculpture with the tradition and function of humankind's oldest scientific instrument – the calendar. Inspired by his travels to England, Mexico and the American west, he created works that together with their impressive scale, placement and design, simultaneously combine aspects of astronomy, physical science and contemporary art. "In our contemporary society we often lose sight of the natural occurrences that once impacted our ancestors and played an important role in shaping our collective conscious. The cyclical nature of the days, and seasons with their patterns light/darkness, plant/harvest, birth/ death have historically given meaning, structure and richness to our lives. This project offers the viewer an opportunity to regain awareness of these fundamental rhythms that continue to subconsciously shape our lives," Van Alstine wrote in 1986.

Responding to a specific site in Texas, Van Alstine created his first "celestial" sculpture using the calendar to connect art and science on the Austin College campus near Dallas. Using primitive stone forms suggesting ritual and observance, "Solstice Calendar" (1986) produces shadows of varying lengths based on the time of year marking the rhythms of season through solstice, equinox, solstice. Similar large scale works were created for SCR Super Computer Research Center in Washington in 1991, "Artery Sunwork" (1993) in Washington, DC and "Via Solaris" (2005–06) in Terre Haute, Indiana at Indiana State University.

Van Alstine's most recent public projects include "Passage" 2011 commissioned by Tsinghua University in Beijing, China and installed on campus as part of the university's Centennial Sculpture Exhibition. On September 11, 2012 "Tempered by Memory" a 35-foot memorial sculpture fabricated with steel beams from the fallen New York World Trade Center was dedicated in High Rock Park, Saratoga Springs, NY. It was a collaborative effort with sculptor Noah Savett. In 2010 "Funambulist" a 30-foot high painted steel sculpture was permanently installed on the Michigan State University campus in Lansing, Michigan. Van Alstine received a merit award in 2008 for his commissioned work "Rings of Unity-Circles of Inclusion" created in conjunction with the 2008 Beijing Olympic Games and installed permanently in the Olympic Garden. "Cardinalis" a 40-foot high piece made partially from a titanium wing of F-14 fighter was commissioned and installed at the Indianapolis International Airport, Indianapolis, Indiana.

Drawings

Van Alstine's drawings have been an informal, spontaneous form of expression. In contrast to the typically long and drawn out creation of one sculpture, he is attracted to drawing precisely because it is immediate and tactile and allows an important opportunity to experiment with color. He equates drawing with the process of clay modeling – adding material by building up layers of pastel or charcoal, removing or excavating through the layers by vigorous erasures. Like a clay sculpture, his drawings are "shaped" rather than "drawn" in the traditional sense. John Dorsey, staff art critic for the Baltimore Sun wrote, "Van Alstine's jaunty drawings recall his sculptures; they also exhibit a line reminiscent of Claes Oldenburg's, combined with sensitive use of color."

Van Alstine's early drawings were tight and functional, often used as "blueprints" for his system-based, arrested energy sculpture of the late 70s and early 80s. Like the sculpture that followed, the drawings soon became more loose and lyrical. By 1983, black and white charcoal drawings like Totem with Spike (1982) and Arch with Spikes (1983) were in keeping with the aggressively expressive three-dimensional works of that time; 4th Beast of Daniel (1983), and the unpainted version of Drastic Measures (1984).

The drawings have continued to evolve, sometime foreshadowing changes in his sculpture such as in drawings like Sphere with Spikes (1990). At other times, the drawings parallel and act as two-dimensional interpretations of the 3D work, as in Implement XIII (1993). In his collaborative 2011 Tempered by Memory 35-foot high memorial sculpture built for the City of Saratoga Springs, New York Citying salvaged steel from the fallen World Trade Center in New York City, Van Alstine executed a number of drawings based on the 3D models he built for the project.

Photography

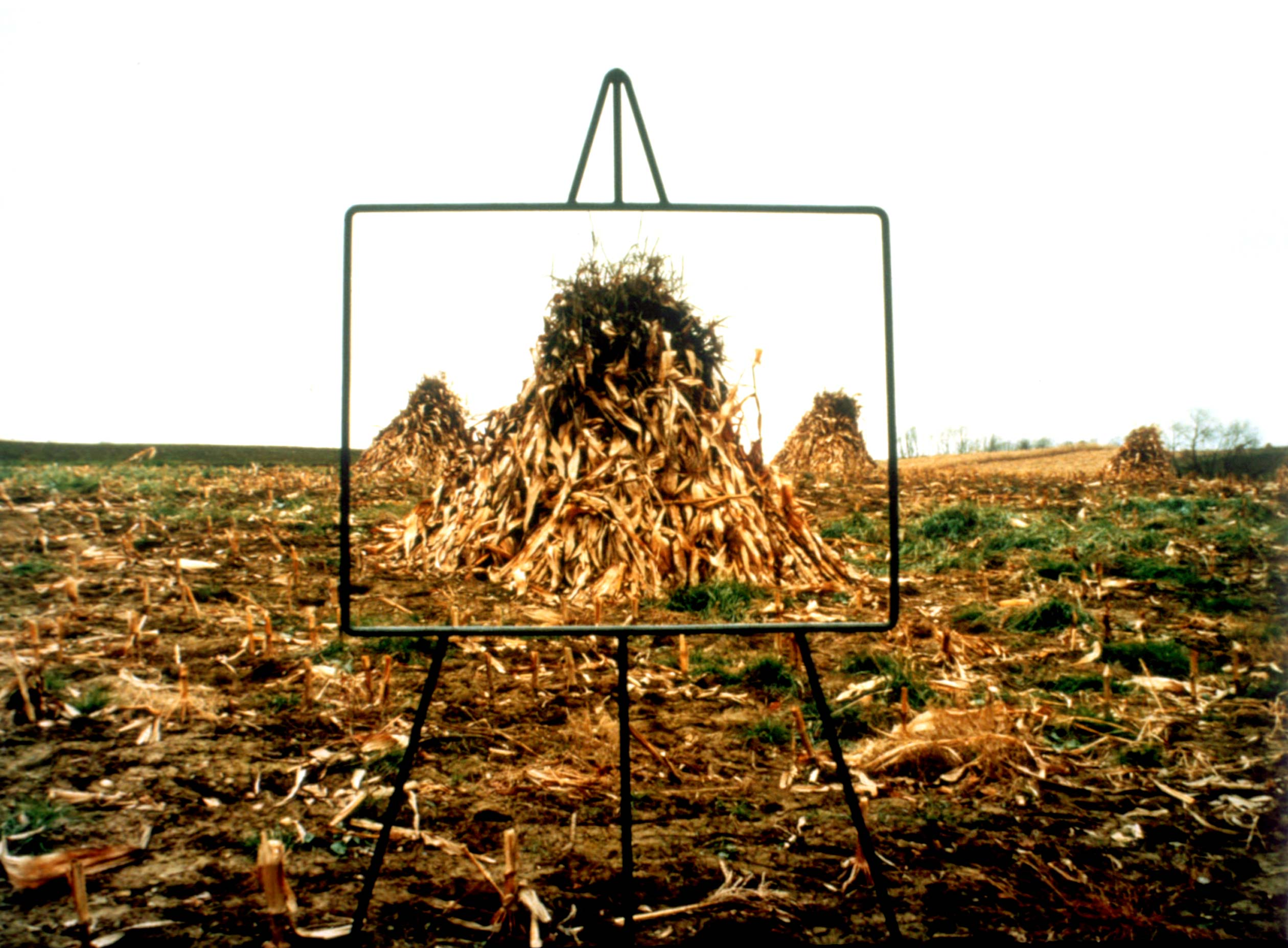
Amish Easel Landscape 1979

Van Alstine's photographs ask knowing questions about sentiment, perception, and the history of art. Created in the late 1970s early 1980s when Van Alstine was in the western U.S., the Easel Landscape Series was a site-specific installation project designed to question and examine the accepted convention of frame as "signal" or "sanctioning" device for art. The series takes clues from many sources, including the "on site" plein air paintings of Claude Monet, such as the Haystack or Cathedral series, and surrealist René Magritte in paintings like The Promenades of Euclid, where Magritte presents the viewer with the image of a painted canvas on an easel simultaneously in front of a window while acting as a window.

The photographs, shot in the field with a medium format film camera, were created before the days of Photoshop and easy digital photo manipulation. The series was exhibited in 1981 at New York's Marlborough Gallery exhibition Color Photography: Five New Views. Artforum Magazine wrote, "Color photography's relationship to the other arts is investigated in John Van Alstine's landscapes. His scenes of majestic mountains and rolling plains are of the sort made famous not only by the 'nature is beautiful' school of black and white photography but also by the plein air school of landscape painting. In Amish Easel Landscape, (1979) and Easel Landscape after Monet, (1980), the landscape contains a steel easel which frames a detail from the same scene. The juxtaposition of 'the photograph within the photograph' and 'the photograph' gives the image a biting conceptual edge that draws attention to the distinctive ways of seeing that photography and painting each offer'."

== Selected Large Scale Public Works ==
- 1982: Trough, Billings, Montana
- 1986: Solitace Calendar, Austin College, Sherman, Texas
- 1993: Artery Sunwork, Bethesda, Maryland
- 2004: 2nd Street Sunwork, Hoboken, New Jersey
- 2006: Via Solaris, Indiana State University Terre Haute, Indiana
- 2006–8: Cardinalis, Indianapolis International Airport, Indianapolis, Indiana
- 2008: Sacandaga Totem, Alexandria, Virginia
- 2008: Rings of Unity – Circles of Inclusion, 2008 Summer Olympics, Beijing, China
- 2008–10: Funambulist, Michigan State University, Lansing, Michigan
- 2010–11: Tempered by Memory, Saratoga Springs, New York
- 2011: Passage, Tsinghua University, Beijing, China

== Public collections ==
- Albany Institute of History and Art, Albany, New York
- Baltimore Museum of Art, Baltimore, Maryland
- Bioethics Institute, Johns Hopkins University, Baltimore, Maryland
- Blanton Museum of Art, University of Texas at Austin
- City of Beijing, China, 2008 Olympic Park Exhibition Collection
- Carnegie Museum of Art, Pittsburgh, Pennsylvania
- Corcoran Gallery of Art, Washington, D.C.
- Dayton Art Institute, Dayton, Ohio
- Dallas Museum of Art, Dallas, Texas
- Delaware Art Museum, Wilmington, Delaware
- Denver Art Museum, Gift of List Foundation, New York City
- Hirshhorn Museum and Sculpture Garden, Smithsonian Institution, Washington, D.C.
- Museum of Fine Arts, Houston, Texas
- Herbert F. Johnson Museum of Art, Cornell University, Ithaca, New York
- Smithsonian American Art Museum, Smithsonian Institution, Washington, D.C.
- Federal Reserve Board of Governors, Washington, D.C.
- Newark Museum of Art, Newark, New Jersey
- Museum of Modern Art, Gulbenkian Foundation, Lisbon, Portugal
- Phoenix Art Museum, Phoenix, Arizona
- Adirondack Museum, Blue Mountain Lake, New York
- The Phillips Collection, Washington, D.C.
- Tsinghua University Museum, Beijing, China
- US State Department's Art in Embassies Program
