= Carole Caroompas =

American painter (1946–2022)

- Born: November 1946 (Scorpio); Oregon City, Oregon
- Died: July 31, 2022
- Education: M.F.A. University of Southern California, Los Angeles, California, 1971. B.A. California State University, Fullerton, California, 1968.
- Known for: Painting
- Awards: John Simon Guggenheim Memorial Fellowship (1995), National Endowment for the Arts, Painting (1987/1993), COLA, City of Los Angeles Individual Artist Grant (1999), California Community Foundation Individual Artist Fellowship (2005)

Carole Caroompas (1946 – July 31, 2022) was an American painter known for work which examined the intersection of pop culture and gender archetypes.

== Early life and education ==
Carole Caroompas was born in Oregon City, Oregon, and spent her childhood in Newport Beach, California.

Caroompas earned a B.A. from California State University, Fullerton and an M.F.A. from the University of Southern California. She taught fine art courses at Otis College of Art and Design in Los Angeles.

== Career ==
Carole Caroompas's paintings are complex, layered compositions that deconstruct popular cultural narratives to explore gender and power dynamics from a feminist perspective. Throughout her five-decade career, the Los Angeles-based artist drew from diverse sources, including literature, mythology, film, and punk aesthetics, to create her "fragmented narratives." Her work is visually dense, theatrical, and demands to be decoded by the viewer

== Awards and fellowships ==
Caroompas' awards included grants from the Adolph and Esther Gottlieb Foundation, COLA (City of L.A.), two from the National Endowment for the Arts and a California Community Foundation Fellowship. In 1995 she was awarded a Guggenheim Fellowship.

== Selected exhibitions ==
Caroompas exhibited at the Ben Maltz Gallery in Los Angeles, the Whitney Museum of American Art, LACMA, the Museum of Modern Art in New York, Western Project in Culver City, Mark Moore in Santa Monica, P.P.O.W. in New York, Sue Spaid Fine Art, the Hammer Museum at UCLA, and the Corcoran Gallery of Art in Washington, DC.

1994: Before and After Frankenstein: The Woman Who Knew Too Much at Sue Spaid Fine Art, Los Angeles, California

1998: Carole Caroompas: Lady of the Castle Perilous at the Ben Maltz Gallery, Otis College of Art and Design, Los Angeles, California

1999: Heathcliff and the Femme Fatale go on Tour at the Mark Moore Gallery in Santa Monica, California

2008: Dancing with Misfits: Eye-Dazzler at Western Project, Culver City, California

2015: Lore and Behold: The Art of Carole Caroompas at Pasadena City College

2025: Carole Caroompas: Heathcliff and the Femme Fatale Go on Tour at the Laguna Art Museum

2015: Carole Caroompas: Mystical Unions at the Nicholas and Lee Begovich Gallery, California State University, Fullerton

== Personal life ==
Caroompas died in 2022, from Alzheimer's disease, at the age of 76.
