= Weatherspoon Art Museum =

Museum in North Carolina, United States

Coordinates: 36.06612°N 79.80583°W

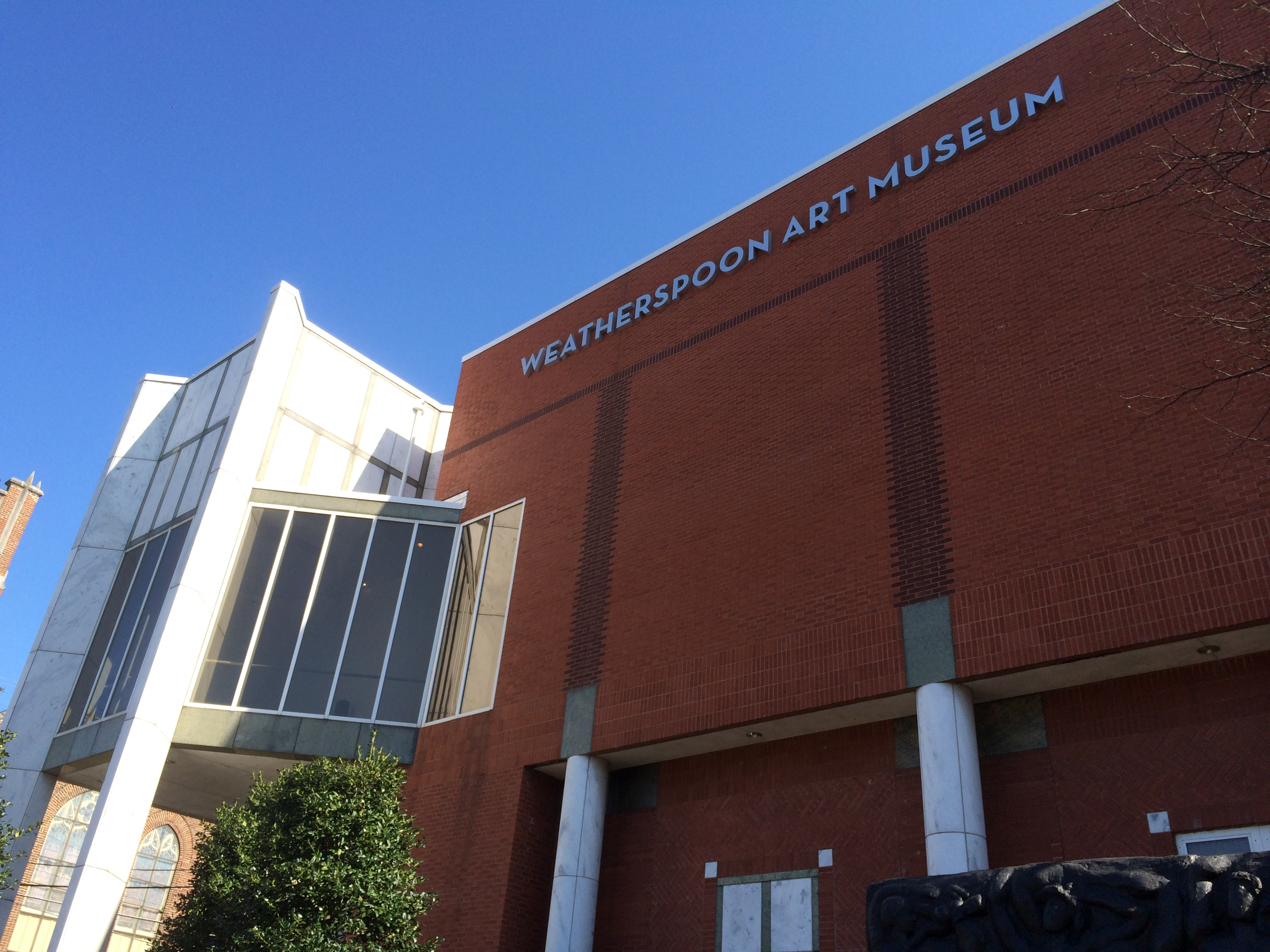
- Location: 1005 Spring Garden St; Greensboro, NC 27412
- Website: weatherspoon.uncg.edu

The Weatherspoon Art Museum is located at the University of North Carolina at Greensboro and is one of the largest collections of modern and contemporary art in the southeast with a focus on American art. Its programming includes fifteen or more exhibitions per year, year-round educational activities, and scholarly publications. The Weatherspoon Art Museum was accredited by the American Alliance of Museums in 1995 and earned reaccreditation status in 2005.

== History ==
Founded in 1941 by Gregory Ivy, first head of the Art Department at Woman’s College (now UNCG), the Woman’s College Art Gallery opened in a former physics lab in the McIver Building, making it the first art gallery within The University of North Carolina system. The following year, the gallery was officially named in honor of Elizabeth McIver Weatherspoon, an art educator and Woman’s College alumna, and the sister of the college’s late president Charles Duncan McIver.

== Expansion ==
In 1985, the Weatherspoon received funding to construct the Anne and Benjamin Cone Building. Occupying a majority of the 42,000-square-foot building designed by Romaldo Giurgola of Mitchell/Giurgola Architects in Philadelphia and New York, the Weatherspoon features six galleries, a sculpture garden, atrium, auditorium, and two storage vaults, in addition to other features shared with the University of North Carolina at Greensboro Department of Art.

== Collections ==
From its inception, the Weatherspoon has focused on building a permanent collection of modern and contemporary art. Numbering close to 6,000 artworks, primarily American, the permanent collection represents all major art movements from the beginning of the 20th century to the present. Work by Willem de Kooning, Helen Frankenthaler, Louise Bourgeois, Morgan O'Hara, Huma Bhabha, Knox Martin, Robert Rauschenberg, John Marin, Alexander Calder, Robert Henri, Cindy Sherman, Louise Nevelson, Eva Hesse and Andy Warhol are included.

=== Dillard Collection of Art on Paper ===
Since 1965, the Weatherspoon Art Museum has received corporate funding from the Dillard Paper Company to present Art on Paper, a biennial exhibition that features regional, national and international artists who have produced significant works made on or of paper. Through the Dillard Fund, the collection of works on paper purchased from those shows numbers close to 550 objects and includes work by Louise Bourgeois, Brice Marden, Knox Martin, Joan Mitchell, Robert Smithson, Frank Stella, Eva Hesse, and Amy Cutler.

=== Etta and Claribel Cone Collection ===
In 1950, 242 works of art were given through a bequest from Etta and Claribel Cone. The collection features prints and bronzes by Henri Matisse as well as a large number of modern prints and drawings, including works by Pablo Picasso, Raoul Dufy and John Graham.

=== Lenoir C. Wright Collection of Japanese Prints ===
Lenoir C. Wright, a professor emeritus at UNCG before his death in 2003, systematically built a collection of Japanese prints initially as a teaching tool and later gave his collection to the Weatherspoon Art Museum. The Wright Collection of Japanese woodblock prints numbers over 500 works of art and includes major printmakers such as Hiroshige, Hokusai and Yoshitoshi.

=== The Dorothy and Herbert Vogel Collection: Fifty Works for Fifty States ===
In 2008 the Weatherspoon Art Museum was selected as the North Carolina museum to receive 50 works on paper from the collection of Dorothy and Herbert Vogel. With the help of the National Gallery of Art, the National Endowment for the Arts, and the Institute of Museum and Library Services, the couple gave 2,500 works from their collection of 4,000+ to public institutions throughout the nation, calling the program The Dorothy and Herbert Vogel Collection: Fifty Works for Fifty States. The Vogels’ donation to the Weatherspoon includes the work of Stephen Antonakos, Lynda Benglis, Charles Clough, Alain Kirili, Lucio Pozzi, Judy Rifka and Richard Tuttle.

=== Sculpture garden ===
The Weatherspoon's sculpture garden features 7,000 square feet of natural plantings, flowers and shrubs, and showcases work by modern and contemporary artists.
