= Anne Tabachnick =

American expressionist painter (1927–1995)

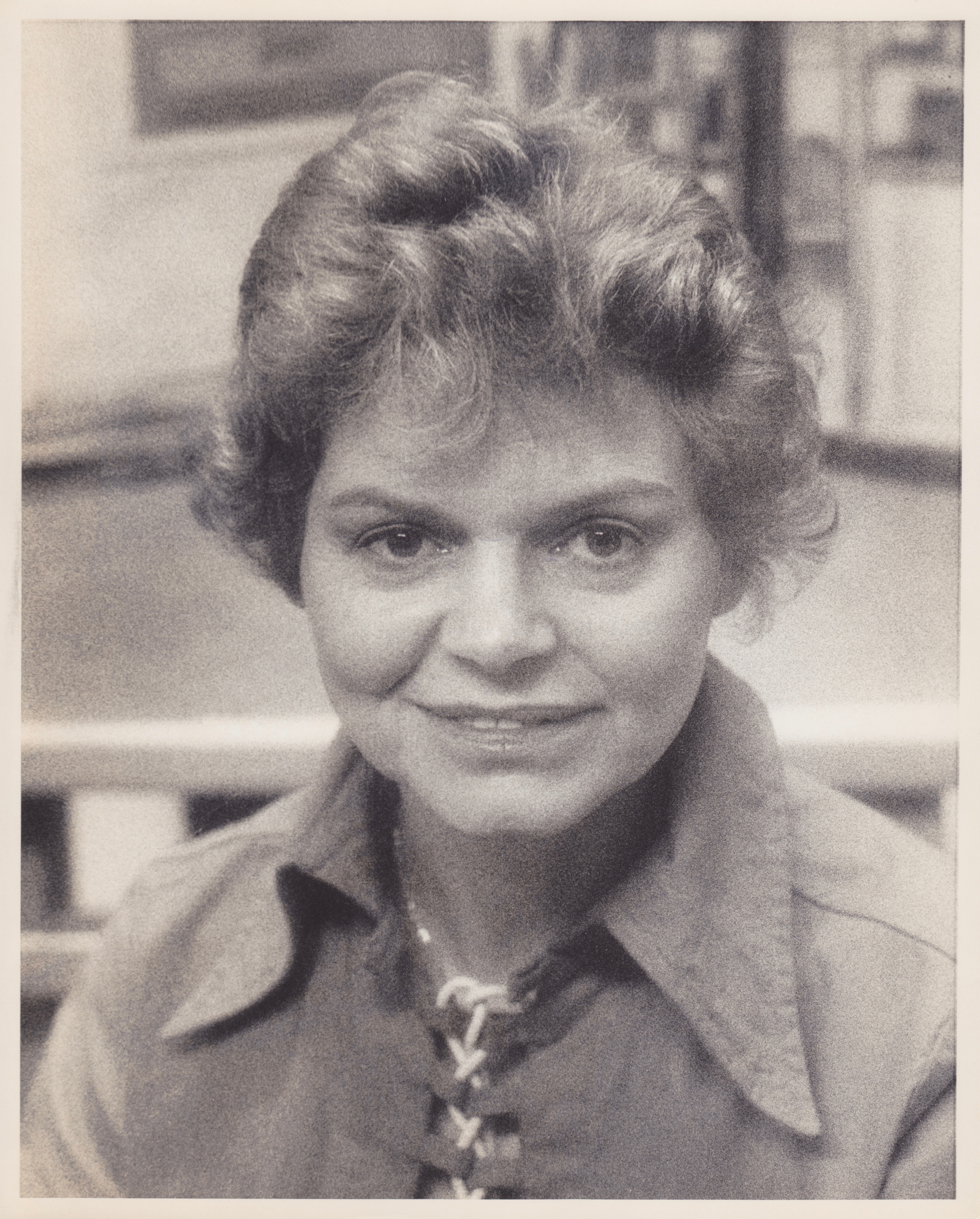
- Born: July 28, 1927; Derby, Connecticut, U.S.
- Died: June 20, 1995 (aged 67); New York, New York
- Known for: Painting
- Spouse: Dupont Newbro (divorced)

Anne Tabachnick (1927 – June 20, 1995) was an American expressionist painter whose style drew inspiration from Abstract Expressionism and the European tradition.

== Biography ==
Born to Eastern European Jewish immigrants in Derby, Connecticut, Anne Tabachnick spent most of her life living and working in New York City. Her father, Abraham Ber Tabachnick, was a prominent Yiddish literary critic and poet, and a news editor for the Jewish Telegraphic Agency in New York. She attended Hunter College, earning a B.A. in anthropology and art, and pursued graduate studies in art at the University of California, Berkeley (1951). After studying briefly with painter Nell Blaine, Tabachnick was awarded a scholarship from the Hans Hofmann School in New York City and Provincetown from February 1946 to August 1950. Tabachnick also studied with William Baziotes in 1961.

== Work ==
Belonging to the New York School, her work was frequently figurative. Tabachnick used thin applied areas of acrylic through which strokes of charcoal defined the subject matter of still life, landscape and figures. Tabachnick drew inspiration from what she called “The Grand Tradition” of European Masters; especially El Greco, Pierre Bonnard, Paul Cézanne and Henri Matisse. She also drew inspiration from East Asian calligraphy painting.

A self-described lyrical expressionist, Tabachnick was associated with Leland Bell, Louisa Matthiasdottir, Jane Freilicher, Larry Rivers, Bob Thompson, and Robert De Niro, Sr.

Along with some two dozen solo shows, Anne Tabachnick's many honors and awards include the Longview Foundation Award (1960), grants from Radcliffe's Bunting Institute (1967 and 1969), grants from the Creative Artists Program (1975 and 1978), the Adolph and Esther Gottlieb Foundation (1982) and the John Simon Guggenheim Fellowship (1983). In 1985, Tabachnick was appointed artist in residence at Altos de Chavón in the Dominican Republic and received numerous invitations to the MacDowell and Yaddo art colonies. Her work has been exhibited at the Museum of Modern Art, the National Academy of Design, the Hyde Collection (in a one-person show) and the Bunting Institute at Radcliffe. In 2015, Lori Bookstein Fine Art hosted a solo exhibit, Anne Tabachnick: Object as Muse, their fifth solo show of Tabachnick's work.

== See also ==
- Bob Thompson
- Robert De Niro, Sr.
- Hans Hofmann
- Guggenheim Fellowship
- Adolph and Esther Gottlieb Foundation
- List of painters by name
- New York School
- Abstract Expressionist
