= Raanan Zilberman =

American Business Executive

- רענן זילברמן
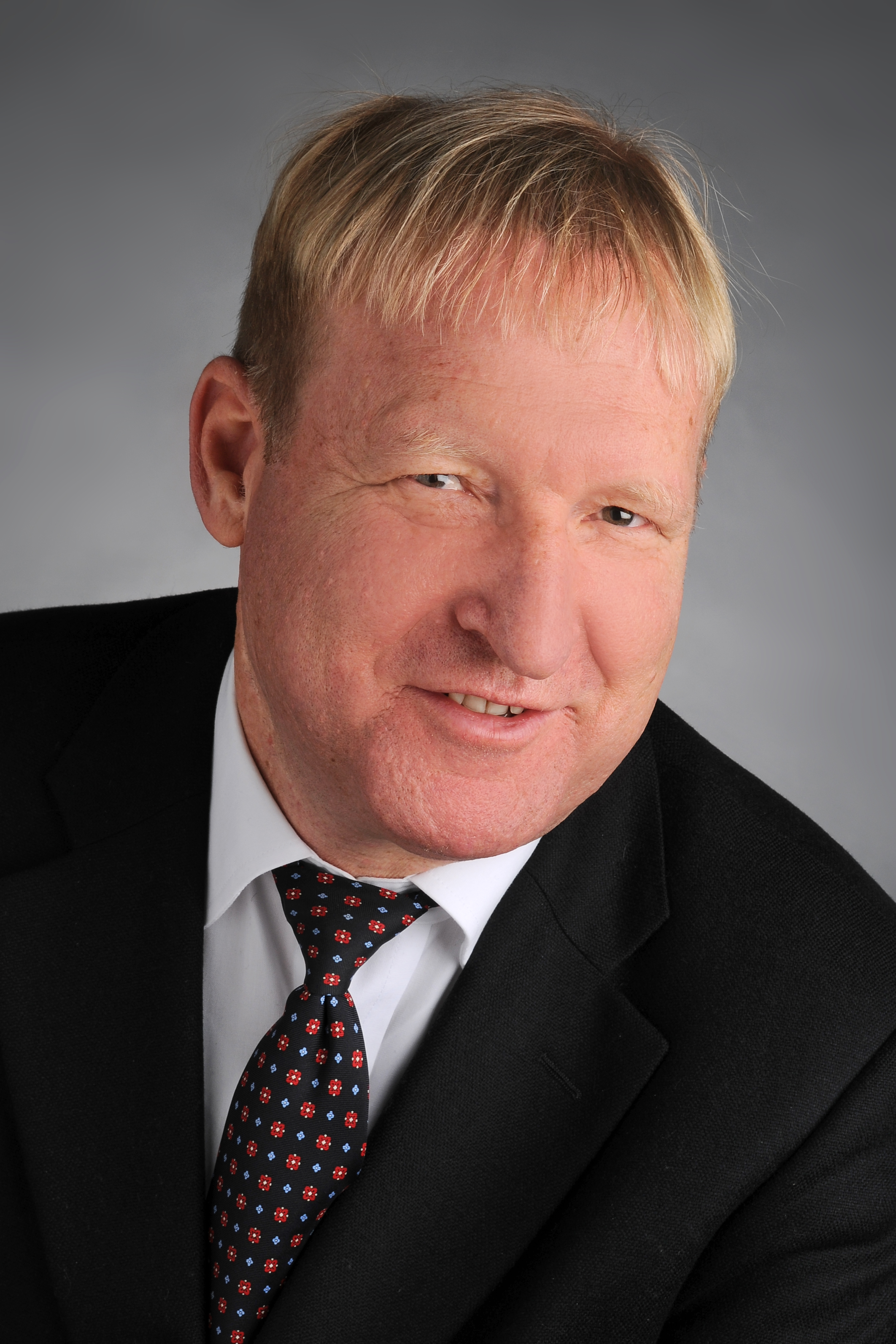
- Born: November 23, 1960 (age 64)
- Occupation: Board Member Vishay Intertechnology

Raanan Zilberman (Hebrew: רענן זילברמן; born November 23, 1960, in Israel) has served as CEO & president of several multinational corporations, most recently as CEO of Caesarstone, a Nasdaq listed multinational manufacturer of engineered quartz surfaces. Zilberman was appointed as CEO in September 2016 and his tenure at Caesarstone was from February 2017 to March 2018.

In February 2017 Zilberman was appointed as the member of the Board at Vishay intertechnology, a NYSE and Fortune 1000 company that is one of the world's largest manufacturers of discrete semiconductors and passive electronic components.

In late 2016 Zilberman ended a 12 year tenure at the head of the Swiss-based Eden SpringsGroup, which comprises several water and coffee companies in Europe. Under Zilberman's lead, Eden Springs had made three exits during the years 2007, 2014, and 2016 from its partners: Danone Corporation, Och-ziff hedge fund and the private equity firm Rhône Group.

== Education ==
Zilberman has a Bachelor of Science degree in industrial engineering and management from Ben Gurion University and master's degree in business administration from Tel Aviv University.

== Business career ==
In 1987 he started working for "Eshed Engineers" and in 1988 joined the founding team of "Aviv Management and Consulting".

In 1990 he joined "Tadiran Appliances", a group focused on manufacturing and marketing of air conditioners, refrigerators and mini-bars. Over his 9-year tenure at "Tadiran", he fulfilled a series of managerial positions, including manager of manufacturing planning & control, production manager and operating manager. Upon the acquisition of Tadiran by the US "Carrier" Corporation, he was sent to training at "United Technology", the parent company, and was named operating manager and industrial VP for the group.

In 2000, Zilberman was named president and CEO of "Tedea-Huntleigh", a publicly traded, multinational company and one of the leaders in its market category, which engages in production and marketing of electromechanical transducers. Through its subsidiaries, "Tedea" ran manufacturing operations in China, UK, France, US and other countries.

In 2002, "Tedea" was acquired by US "Vishay Corporation", and Zilberman was named president of "Vishay Transducer".

In 2005, Zilberman was named CEO of the "Danone Springs of Eden", a joint venture between "Danone" Corporation (~60%) and "Mey Eden" (~40%). The new venture was headquartered between Lausanne and Geneva, Switzerland. That period was characterized by mergers & acquisitions of dozens of companies that were acquired from entrepreneurs across Europe and merged into the Eden group with single brand and unified management platform.

In 2007, the venture was acquired by "Mey Eden", with the participation of "TPG Capital", a private equity investment firm and "Och-Ziff", a US hedge fund. Zilberman was named as CEO of the "Eden Springs" Group. This period was characterized by changes in the Company's services and product strategy: through a combination of organic growth and mergers and acquisitions, the Company has solidified its position in the office coffee & water services market in Europe. At that time, Zilberman's cost of wage was 15.7 million NIS a year (~2.78 million Euro). A prospectus published by Mey Eden reported that Zilberman's cost of wage at the beginning of 2010 was 82 thousand Euros per month.

In 2014, the Group was acquired by a partnership of US investment fund "Rhône Group" and the Company's management and Zilberman was appointed to CEO. Under his leadership and following the change of ownership, the Group acquired its main competitor in the European market, "Nestle Waters Direct".

In 2016, under Zilberman's lead, the group was acquired by Cott (NYSE: COT), a multinational soft drinks corporation which operates in more than 50 countries with a turnover of 3.5 billion USD. Eden Spring was acquired for 535 million USD from Rhône Capital.

During his term at the helm, the Group made over 60 mergers and acquisitions of competitors with the Company solidifying its presence in 18 countries, becoming one of the leaders in the water & coffee solutions and services providers, to business and offices in Europe.

== Personal life ==
Raanan Zilberman is married to Sinaya and they have two children, Sapir and Omer. Zilberman currently lives in Geneva, Switzerland.
