= Justin Raanan =

Periodontist

Justin Raanan is a periodontist, former instructor of Harvard School of Dental Medicine and former teaching assistant at the Herman Ostrow School of Dentistry of USC.

== Education ==
Justin Raanan was born and raised in Beverly Hills. He attended the University of California, Los Angeles for his undergraduate degree. He studied anthropology and biology, and graduated magna cum laude with a Bachelor of Science. He also holds a DMD from the University of Southern California and a MMSc from Harvard.

== Awards ==
- Harvard Research Award (2016)
- Nominated Balint Orban Memorial Competition (2015)
- UCLA: magna cum laude (2009)
- UCLA Golden Key International Honor Society (2007)
- Phi Theta Kappa medal (2004)
