= Spencer Finch =

American artist

Spencer Finch (born 1962 in New Haven, Connecticut) is an American artist. After attending The Hotchkiss School, he graduated magna cum laude with a B.A. in comparative literature from Hamilton College in 1985. Finch then pursued an M.F.A. in sculpture from the Rhode Island School of Design, graduating in 1989. The first retrospective of his work, which ended in March 2008, was assembled at MASS MoCA in North Adams, MA. He currently lives and works in Brooklyn, NY.

Spencer Finch, Moonlight (Luna County, New Mexico, July 13, 2003), 2003, High CRI fluorescent tube with nine colored filters, 24" x 3.2" x 3"

Finch produces work in a wide variety of mediums, including watercolor, photography, glass, electronics, video and fluorescent lights. He is perhaps best known for dealing with the elusive concepts of memory and perception through light installations. After measuring with a colorimeter the light that exist naturally in a specific place and time, Finch re-constructs the luminosity of the location through artificial means. For example, Moonlight (Luna County, New Mexico, July 13, 2003) replicates the exact light of the full moon that shone over the desert of Luna County, New Mexico on the evening of July 13, 2003.

Creative Time, Friends of the High Line, and the New York City Department of Parks and Recreation commissioned The River That Flows Both Ways to Spencer Finch as the inaugural art installation for the High Line Park. The work is integrated into the window bays of the former Nabisco Factory loading dock, as a series of 700 purple and grey colored glass panes. Each color is exactly calibrated to match the center pixel of 700 digital pictures, one taken every minute, of the Hudson River, therefore presenting an extended portrait of the river that gives the work its name. Creative Time worked with the artist to realize the site-specific concept that emerged when he saw the rusted, disused mullions of the old factory, which metal and glass specialists Jaroff Design helped to prepare and reinstall.

Finch was chosen to create the only work of art commissioned for the National September 11 Memorial & Museum. For his work, Trying To Remember the Color of the Sky on That September Morning, Finch hand-painted 2,983 squares of Fabriano paper — one square in a unique shade of blue for every person killed in the September 11 attacks and in the 1993 bombing of the World Trade Center.
