= Beverly McIver =

American painter

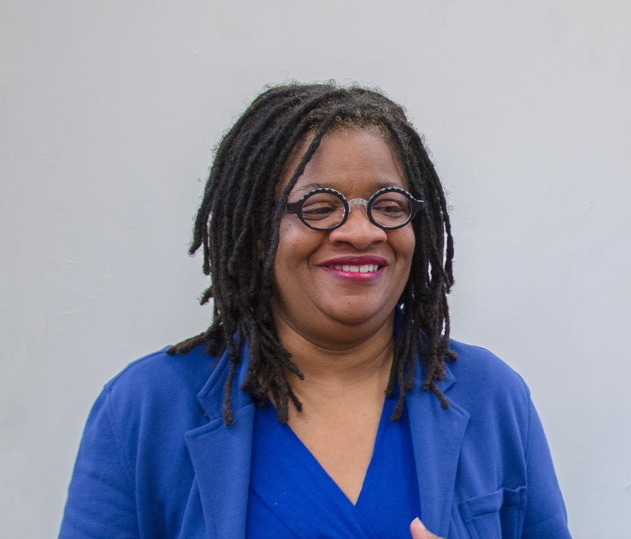
- Born: c. 1962; Greensboro, North Carolina
- Education: Pennsylvania State University North Carolina Central University
- Known for: Painting
- Awards: Emerging Artist Grant Recipient, Durham Arts Council

Beverly McIver (born c. 1962) is a contemporary artist, mostly known for her self-portraits, who was born and raised in Greensboro, NC. She is currently the Esbenshade Professor of the Practice of Art, Art History and Visual Studies at Duke University.

== Early life and education ==
McIver was the youngest of three daughters and raised by a single mother who worked as a maid to support their family. Her mother’s attention and resources were mostly focused on McIver’s older sister, Renee, who was mentally disabled. Her autobiographical paintings are richly colorful and chronicles her life struggle with her African-American identity.

While attending a predominantly white, affluent high school, McIver was a member of the school’s clowning club. Performing in clown makeup and a wig empowered McIver: “As a clown…I was transformed, and in many ways more acceptable to society. No one cared that I was black or poor. I was embraced.” Considering going to clown school for a brief period of time, McIver decided to pursue a career in art, earning her Master of Fine Art at Penn State University and an honorary doctorate from North Carolina Central University. She earned her Bachelor of Arts in Painting and Drawing at North Carolina Central University in 1987.

== Career ==
McIver's work explores personal identity, and besides self-portraiture she is known for painting the people who surround her in everyday life. She received several honors for her work including a Guggenheim Fellowship and the Louis Comfort Tiffany Award. A documentary about McIver's life entitled Raising Renee was featured on HBO and nominated for an Emmy award. In 2011, McIver was named "top ten in painting" for Art In America magazine. McIver also has works featured in the Mint Museum of Art & the North Carolina Museum of Art. She's currently the Esbenshade Professor of the Practice of Visual Arts at Duke University. Her work is also in the Weatherspoon Art Museum in Greensboro, N.C., the Baltimore Museum of Art, the Minneapolis Institute of Art, the NCCU Museum of Art, the Asheville Museum of Art, The Crocker Art Museum, The Cameron Art Museum, The Nasher Museum and the Nelson Fine Arts Museum on the campus of Arizona State University. She won the Rome Prize in Visual Arts from the American Academy in Rome in 2017-2018.

== Awards ==
McIver was a 2014 Artist-in-Residence at the McColl Center for Art + Innovation in Charlotte, NC. Her work has been reviewed in Art News, Art in America The New York Times and a host of local newspapers. She has received numerous grants and awards including the Anonymous Was A Woman Foundation grant, a John Simon Guggenheim Fellowship, a Radcliffe Fellowship from Harvard University, a Marie Walsh Sharpe Foundation award, a distinguished Alumni Award from Pennsylvania State University, a Louis Comfort Tiffany Foundation Award and Creative Capital grant.
