= Santa Reparata International School of Art =

Arts school in Florence, Italy

Coordinates: 43°46′43.9″N 11°15′26.8″E

Santa Reparata International School of Art (SRISA) is a non-profit US 501 (c)(3) studio arts, design and liberal arts higher education institution located in the center of Florence, Italy. Founded in 1970, SRISA provides study abroad programs for international students. Courses are taught in English, and students receive transferable academic credit through partnerships with Maryville University.

The school encompasses four campuses: San Gallo (main campus) once home to the famous Libreria Le Monnier, Santa Reparata, Studio 55 and Cavour. All are within a three to 5 minute walking distance. attended by international students, mostly American, who are pursuing a semester, year or summer program abroad. The courses are taught in English and may be taken for university credit through Maryville University. History

Located in the historic center of Florence, SRISA was founded in 1970 by artists Dennis Olsen, Giuseppe Gattuso, and Michael Schnorr as the Santa Reparata Graphic Art Center. The art center/school gained popularity and in 2001, was reorganized by Rebecca Olsen, Dennis Olsen and Meridith Dean as a U.S. non-profit organization and renamed Santa Reparata International School of Art. The school expanded its academic offerings to include Spring and Fall semesters, along with two sessions in the Summer in art, design and liberal arts.

Santa Reparata has been a part of Florence's artistic life for more than 40 years and thrives on an interchange of culture and ideas.

== Academics ==
All courses are taught by locally and internationally recognized instructors within the extensive facilities. Courses and Programs follow the U.S. academic model and include: Photography, Printmaking, Book Arts, Painting, Drawing, Fashion Design, Italian Language, Graphic Design, Digital Imaging, Video, Interior Design/ Architecture, Art History, History, Humanities, Sociology, Creative Writing, among others.

== Accreditation ==
Academic credit for SRISA programs is granted through partnerships with accredited U.S. institutions, including Maryville University.

== Partnerships ==
SRISA affiliates and partnerships consist of Faculty-led Programs and Direct Enrollment Affiliations with numerous U.S. universities and study abroad programs. Partner Institutions include several universities within the University of Wisconsin system, Rochester Institute of Technology and many more.

== The SRISA Gallery ==
The SRISA Gallery is a contemporary art gallery located in our San Gallo main campus with visibility from the street. The gallery host international and local artists at least four times a year.
