= Marin Boulevard station =

Marin Boulevard
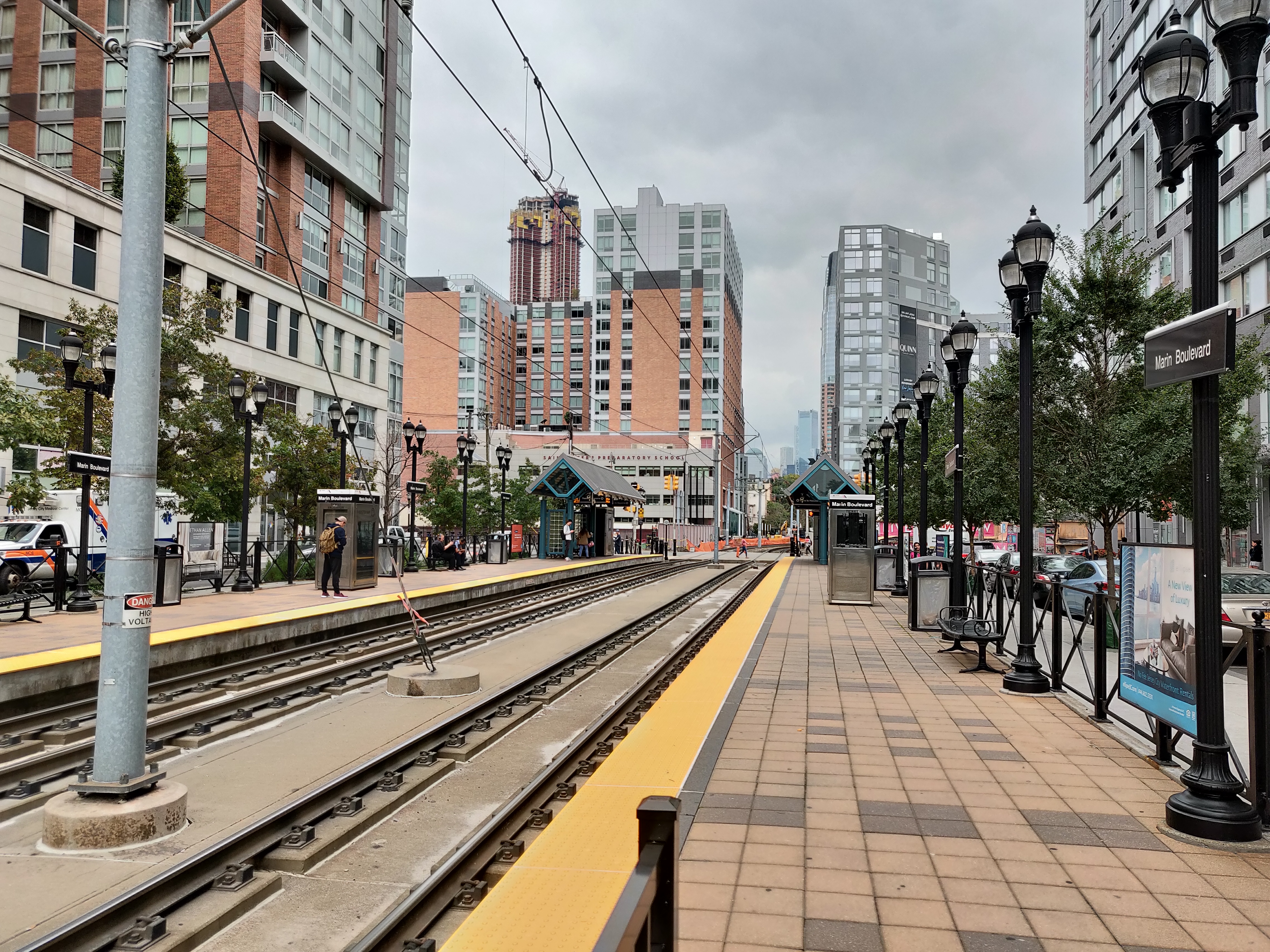
- Marin Boulevard station platforms in October 2018

General information
- Location: Marin Boulevard at Morris Street and Morris Boulevard; Jersey City, New Jersey
- Coordinates: 40°42′52″N 74°02′36″W
- Owner: New Jersey Transit
- Platforms: 2 side platforms
- Tracks: 2
- Connections: NY Waterway

Construction
- Cycle facilities: Yes
- Accessible: Yes

Other information
- Fare zone: 1

History
- Opened: April 15, 2000

Passengers
- 2025: 1,380 (average weekday)
- Rank: 18 of 24

Services
Preceding station	NJ Transit	Following station
Jersey Avenue toward West Side Avenue	West Side–Tonnelle	Essex Street toward Tonnelle Avenue
Jersey Avenue toward 8th Street	Bayonne–Hoboken	Essex Street toward Hoboken
Bayonne Flyer does not stop here
Location

Marin Boulevard station is an active light rail station in the Liberty Harbor neighborhood of Jersey City, Hudson County, New Jersey. Located on Morris Boulevard at the intersection of the namesake Marin Boulevard, the station services trains of the Hudson–Bergen Light Rail (HBLR). Marin Boulevard trains run West Side–Tonnelle and 8th Street–Hoboken routes, while the Bayonne Flyer bypasses the station. Marin Boulevard station contains two tracks, serviced by two side platforms, which splits the two directions of Morris Boulevard. Connection is available to NY Waterway's dock at the south end of Marin Boulevard. Ferries operate to Paulus Hook in Jersey City and Pier 11/Wall Street on the east side of Manhattan.

Marin Boulevard station opened on April 15, 2000 as part of the first operating segment of the HBLR between 34th Street station in Bayonne and Exchange Place station in Jersey City.

== Gallery ==
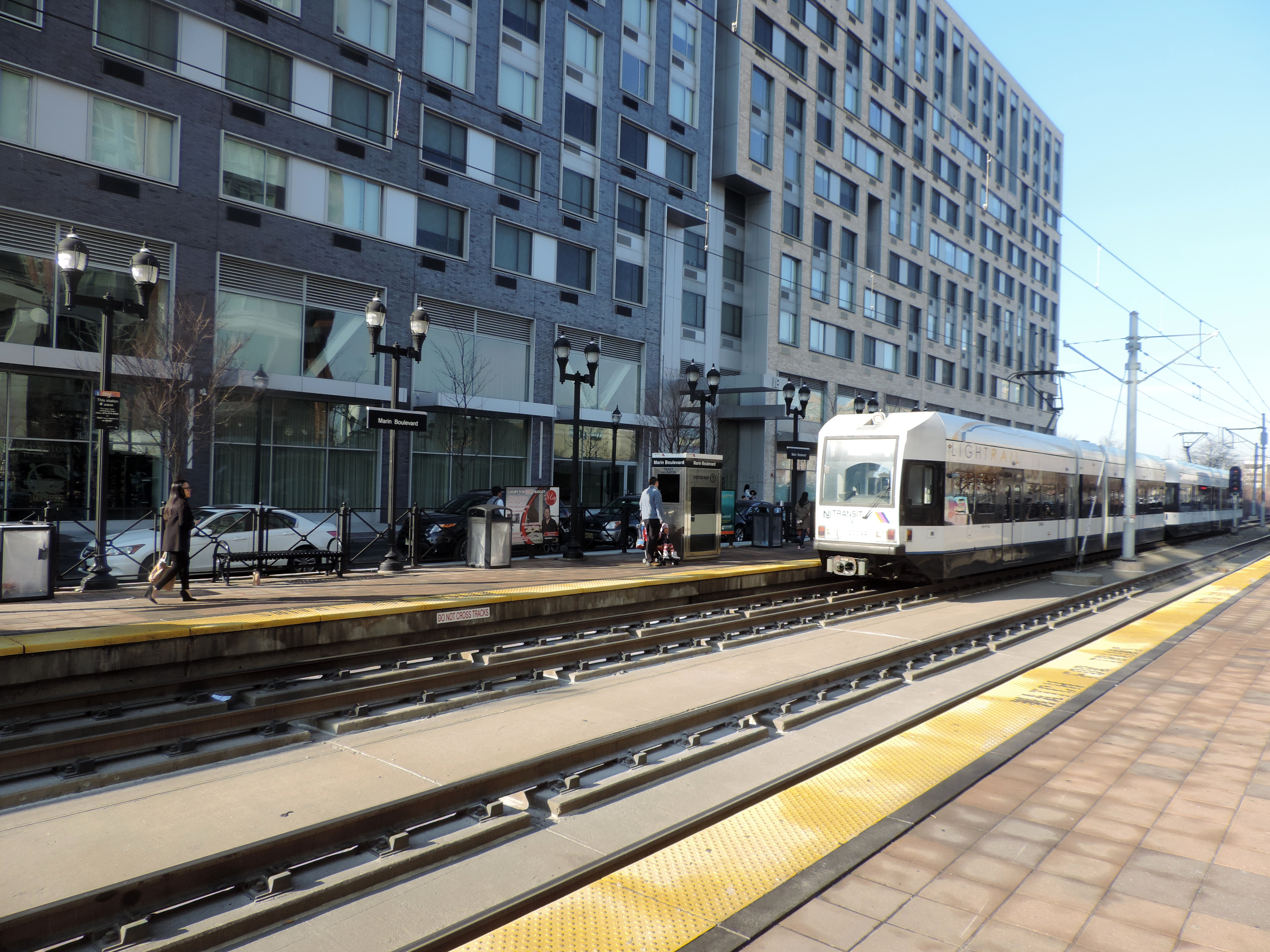
Northbound train arriving

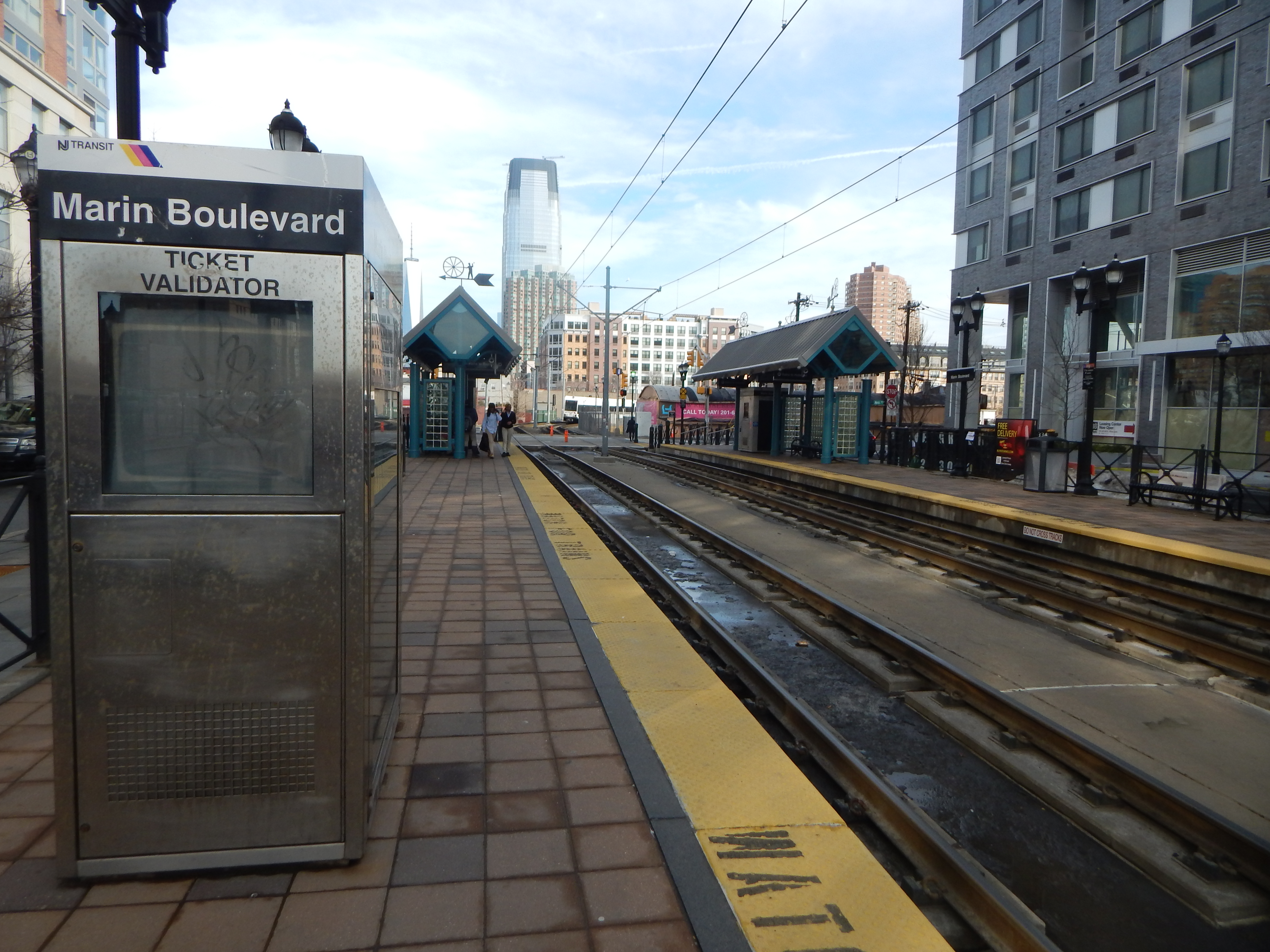
The station in March 2015

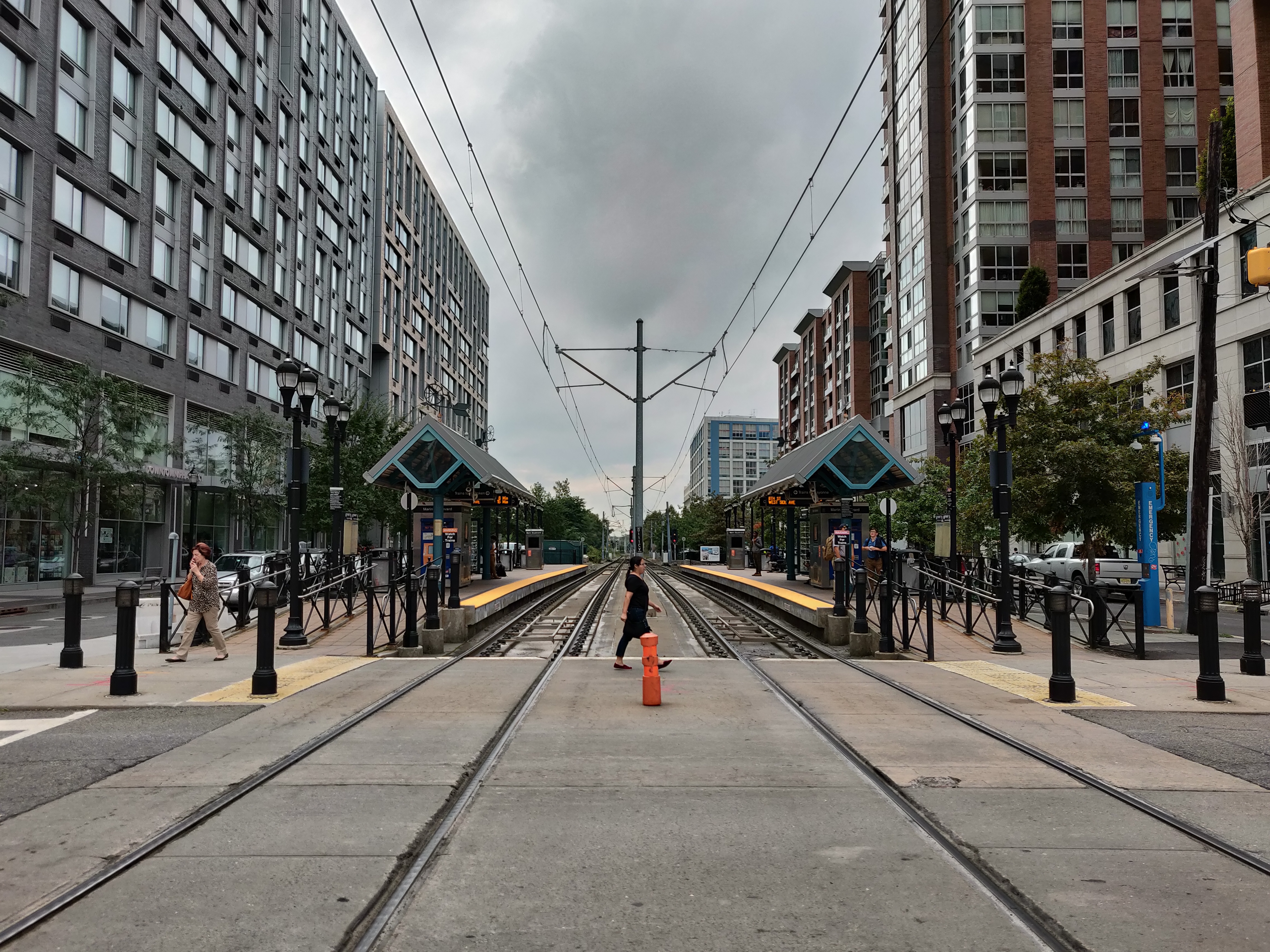
View from the Main Boulevard crossing
