= Jersey Avenue =

Jersey Avenue may refer to:

- New Jersey Route 91, in Middlesex County, New Jersey
- Jersey Avenue station, in New Brunswick, New Jersey
- Jersey Avenue station (Hudson–Bergen Light Rail), in Jersey City, New Jersey
