= Essex Street station =

Essex Street station could refer to:

- Essex Street station (Hudson–Bergen Light Rail), a light rail station in Jersey City, New Jersey, United States
- Essex Street station (NJ Transit), a commuter rail station in Hackensack, New Jersey, United States
- Essex Street station (BMT Nassau Street Line), a subway station in New York City, United States
