= Jersey Avenue station (Hudson–Bergen Light Rail) =

Jersey Avenue
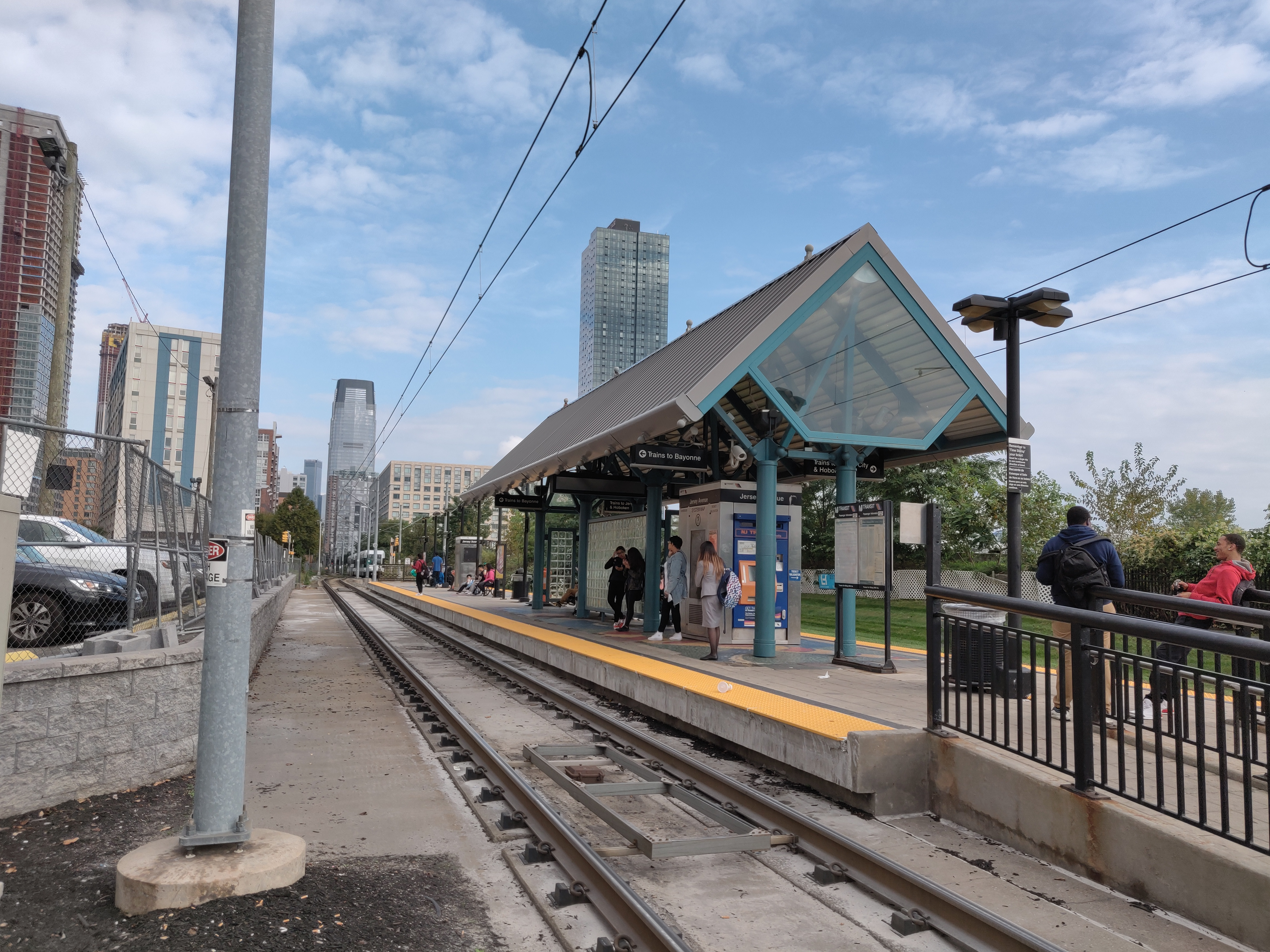
- Jersey Avenue station in October 2018

General information
- Location: Jersey Avenue at Regent Street; Jersey City, New Jersey
- Coordinates: 40°42′54″N 74°02′55″W
- Owner: New Jersey Transit
- Platforms: 1 island platform
- Tracks: 2
- Connections: NJ Transit Bus: 1, 81

Construction
- Cycle facilities: Yes
- Accessible: Yes

Other information
- Fare zone: 1

History
- Opened: April 15, 2000

Passengers
- 2025: 1,661 (average weekday)
- Rank: 12 of 24

Services
Preceding station	NJ Transit	Following station
Liberty State Park toward West Side Avenue	West Side–Tonnelle	Marin Boulevard toward Tonnelle Avenue
Liberty State Park toward 8th Street	Bayonne–Hoboken	Marin Boulevard toward Hoboken
Bayonne Flyer does not stop here
Location

Jersey Avenue station is an active light rail station in the Liberty Harbor neighborhood of Jersey City, Hudson County, New Jersey. Located on Regent Street east of the intersection of the namesake Jersey Avenue, the station services trains of the Hudson–Bergen Light Rail (HBLR). Jersey Avenue trains run West Side–Tonnelle and 8th Street–Hoboken routes, while the Bayonne Flyer bypasses the station. Jersey Avenue station has a single island platform to service both tracks. A couple of NJ Transit's buses stop a block north on Grand Street.

Jersey Avenue station opened on April 15, 2000 as part of the first operating segment of the HBLR between 34th Street station in Bayonne and Exchange Place station in Jersey City.

== Image gallery ==
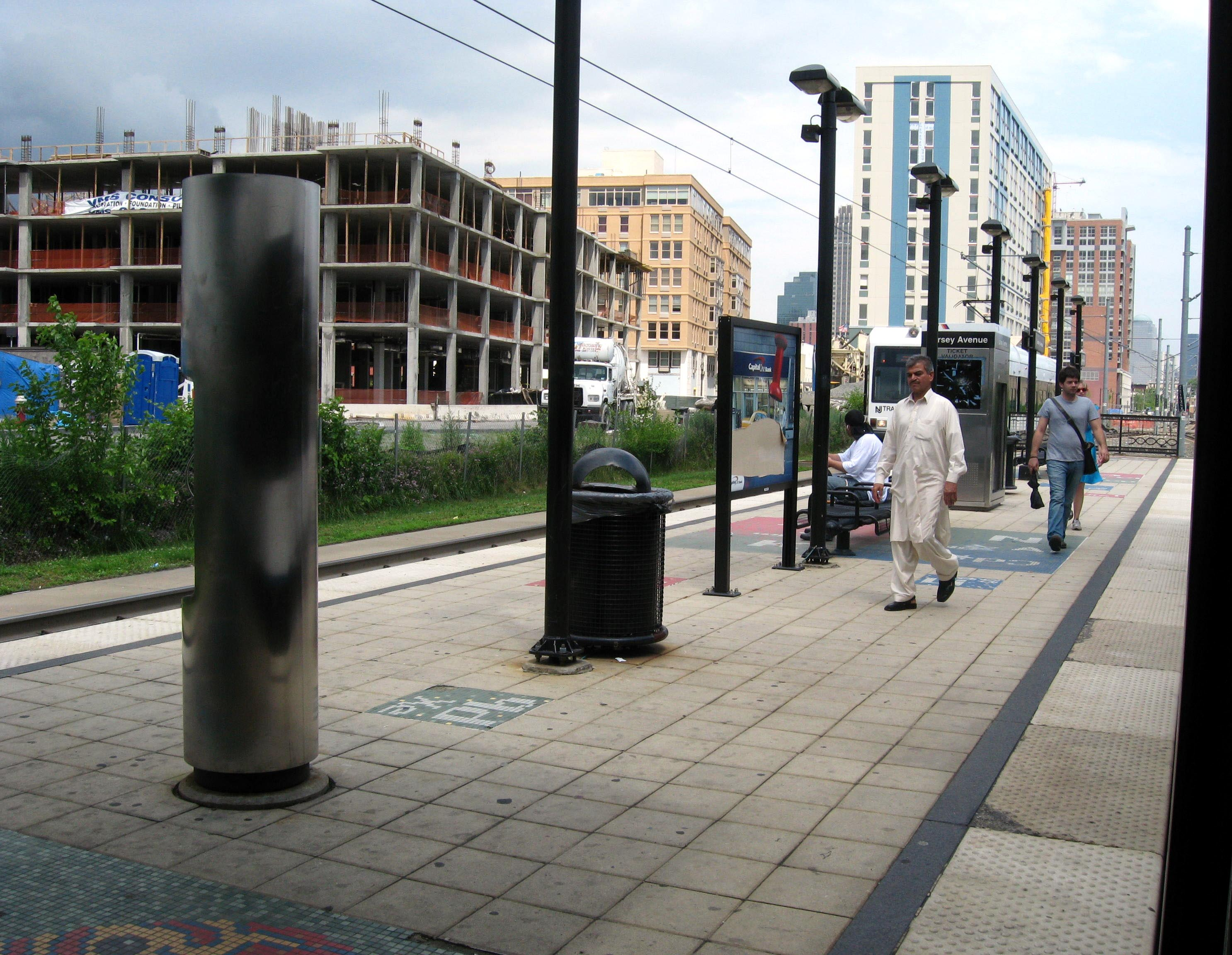
Looking east in 2008

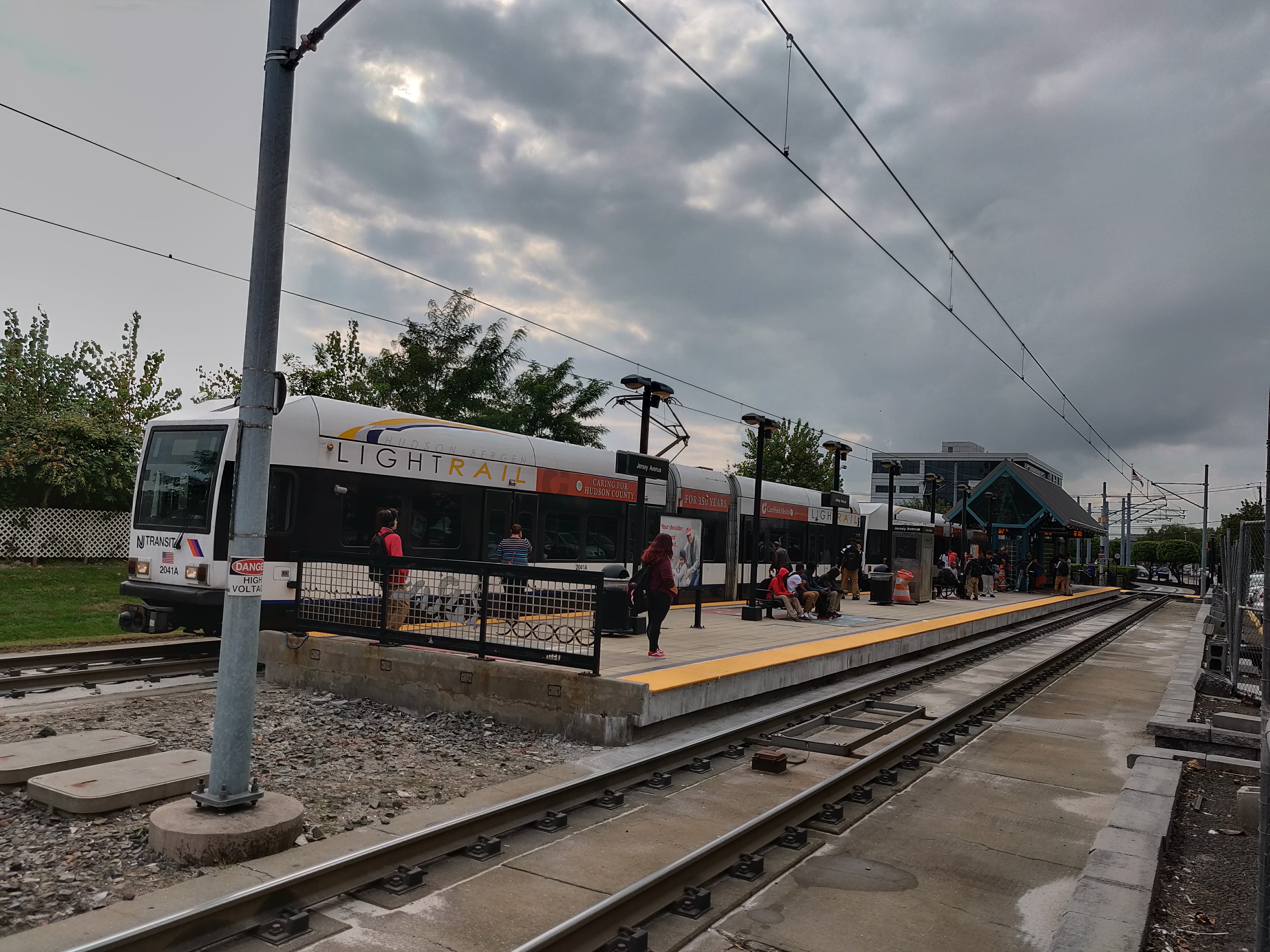
West end of the platform
