= Liberty Landing Ferry =

Ferry service in New York City and New Jersey

Liberty Landing City Ferry
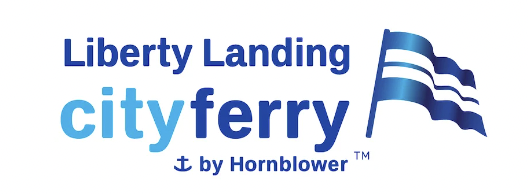

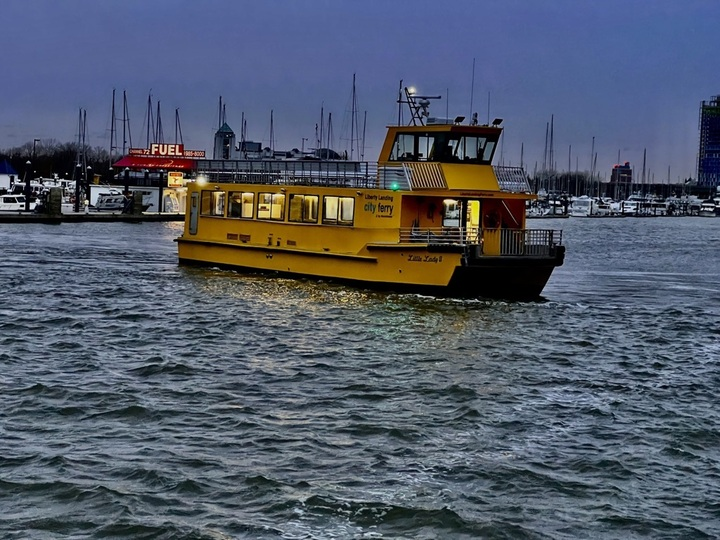
- The Little Lady II departing the Warren Street dock, bound for Manhattan.
- Locale: Jersey City and New York City
- Waterway: Hudson River, Morris Canal Basin
- Transit type: Commuter ferry
- Carries: Passengers
- Terminals: Liberty Landing Marina, Warren Street, Battery Park City Ferry Terminal
- Owner: Statue City Cruises
- Operator: Liberty Landing Ferries
- Began operation: 1999
- System length: Approximately 1.5 miles (2.4 km)
- Headway: 1 hour
- Frequency: 12/day
- No. of lines: 1
- No. of vessels: 2 (1 in regular service)
- No. of terminals: 3
- Daily ridership: 192 (2011)
- Connections at Liberty Landing Marina
- Ship: Ellis Island and Liberty Island ferries
- Bus: EZ Ride LSP Shuttle (Seasonal)
- Connections at Warren Street
- Tram: Hudson-Bergen Light Rail at Essex Street
- Connections at Battery Park City
- Ship: NYC Ferry SG Route, NY Waterway routes to Hoboken, Paulus Hook, 14th Street, and Port Imperial, Seastreak Belford route
- Bus: M20, M22, M9, Downtown Connection
- Website: http://www.libertylandingcityferry.com/

The Liberty Landing Ferry, officially known as the Liberty Landing City Ferry, is a commuter ferry service based at Liberty Landing Marina in Jersey City, New Jersey, United States. It provides service between Liberty State Park and Liberty Harbor in Jersey City and the Battery Park City Ferry Terminal at Brookfield Place in Battery Park City, Manhattan. It is one of several private operators of ferries, sightseeing boats, and water taxis in the Port of New York and New Jersey.

== Service ==
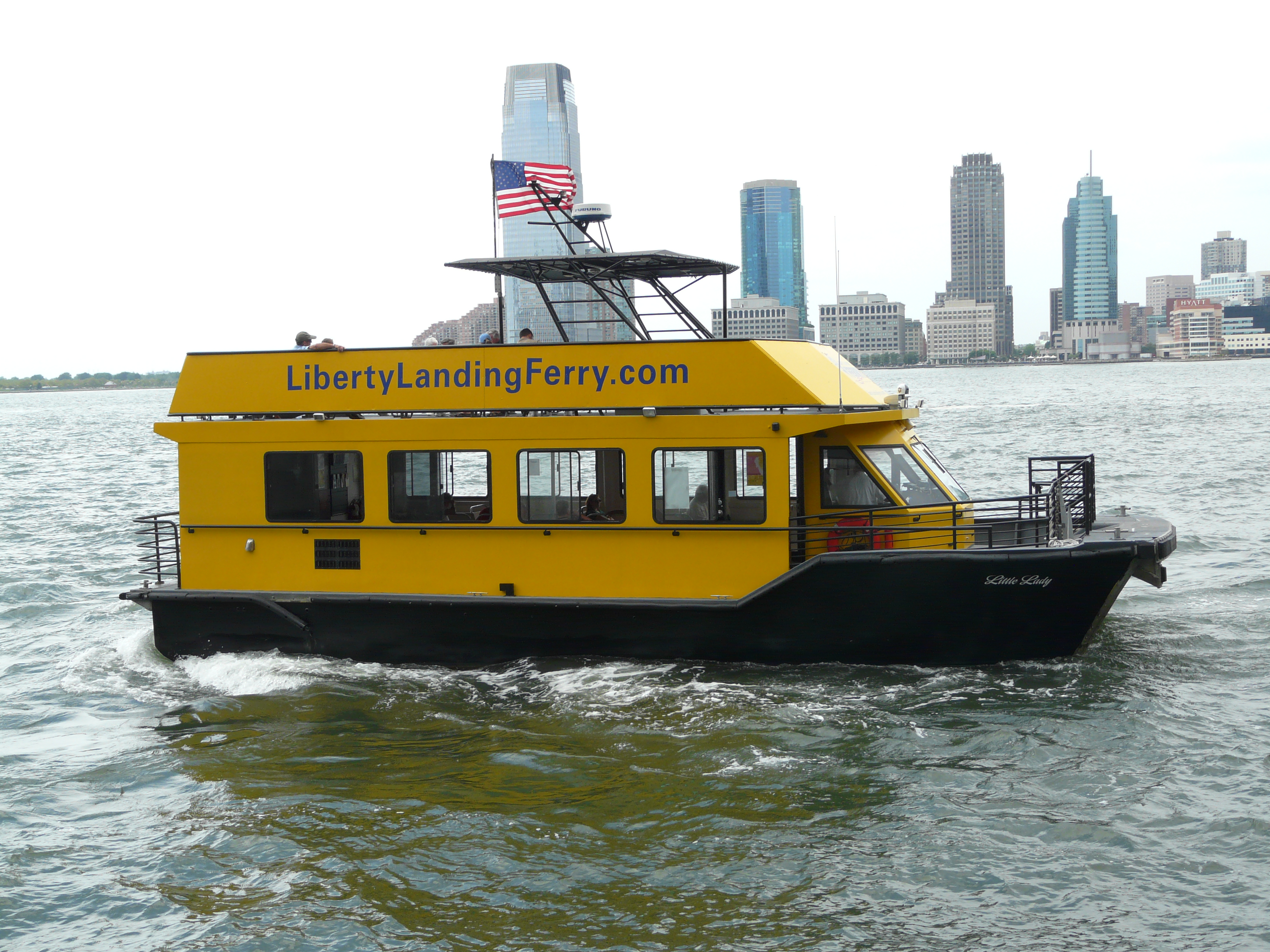
The Little Lady in 2011

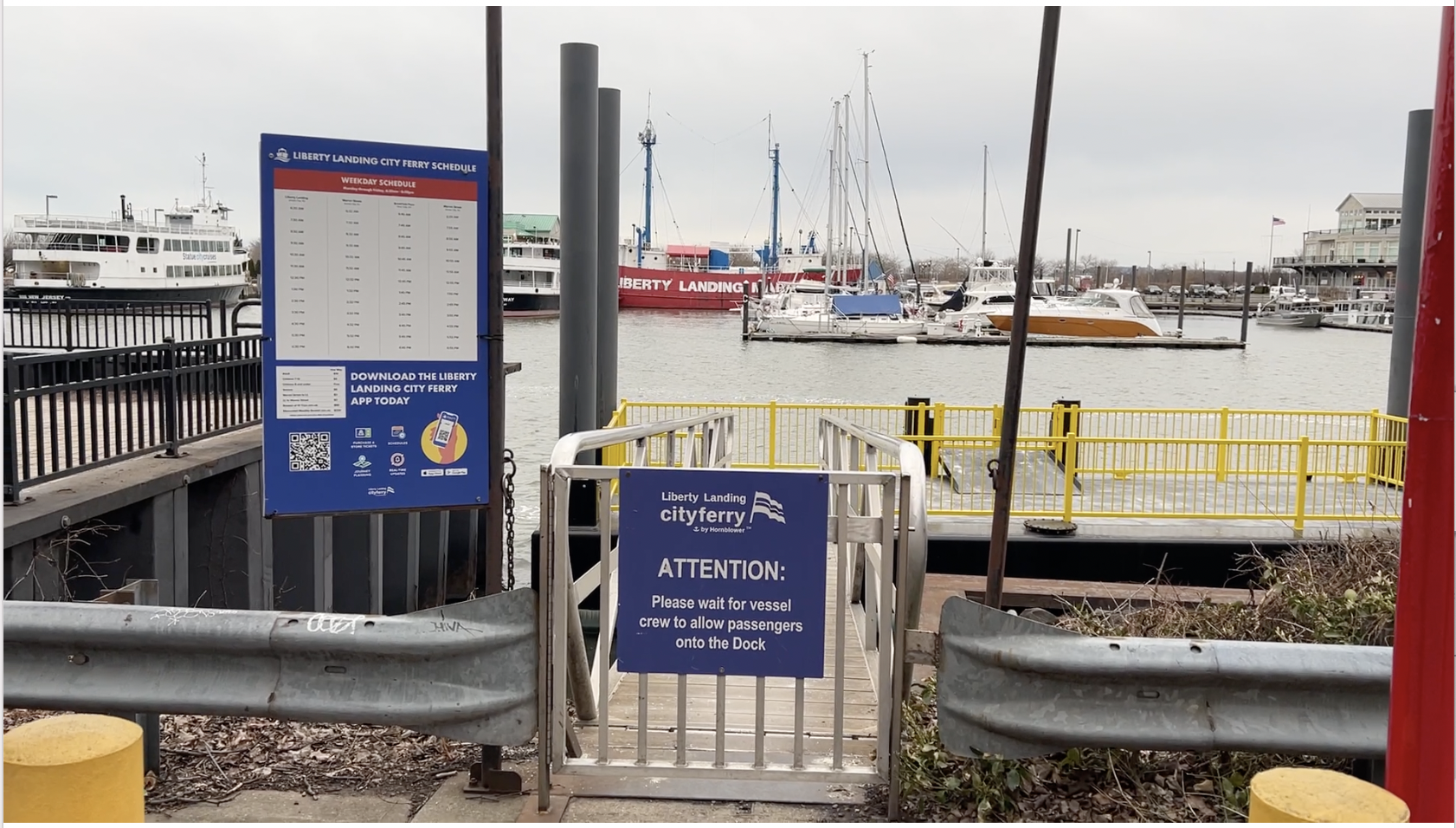
The Warren Street dock

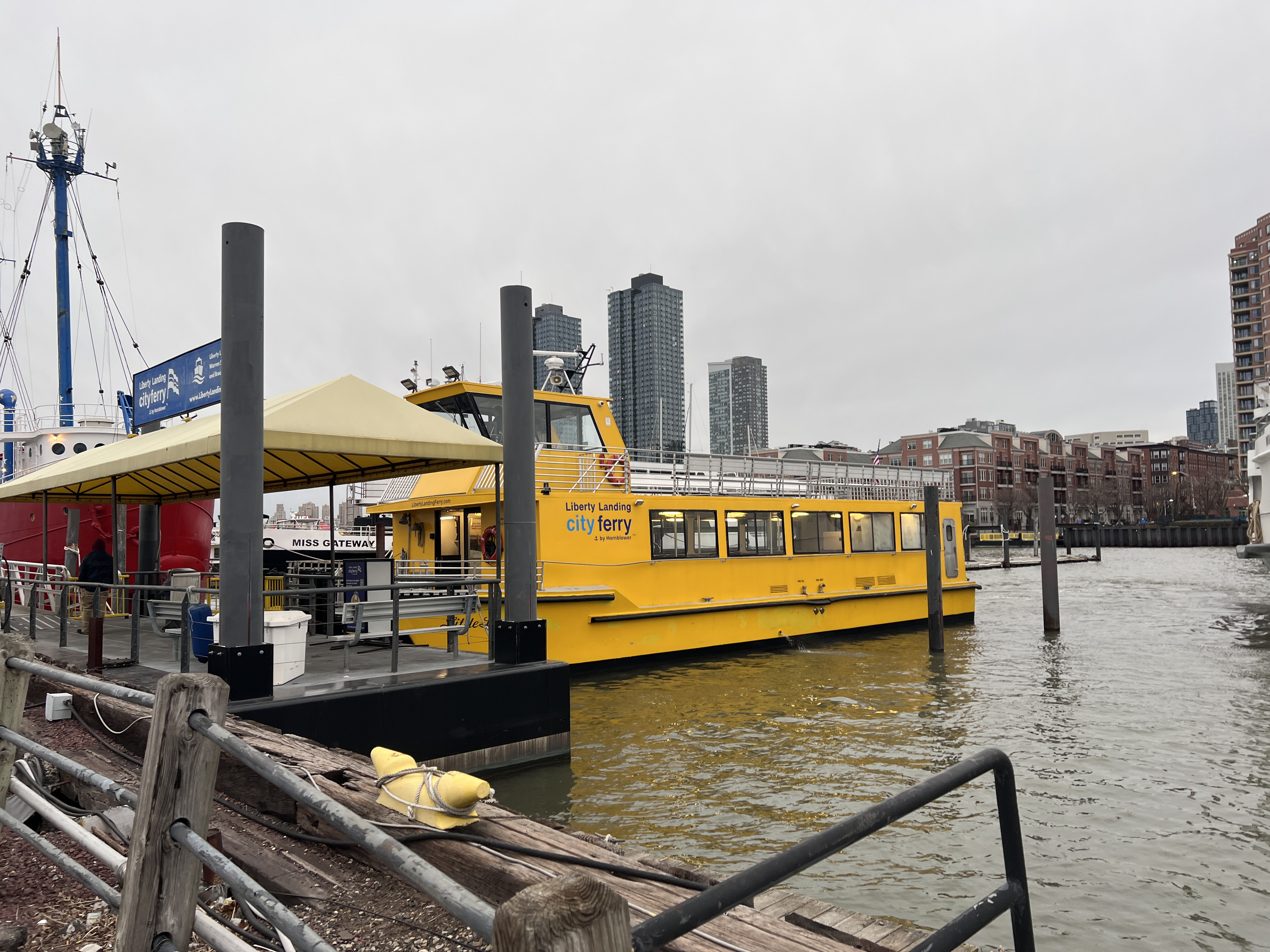
The Liberty Landing Marina dock

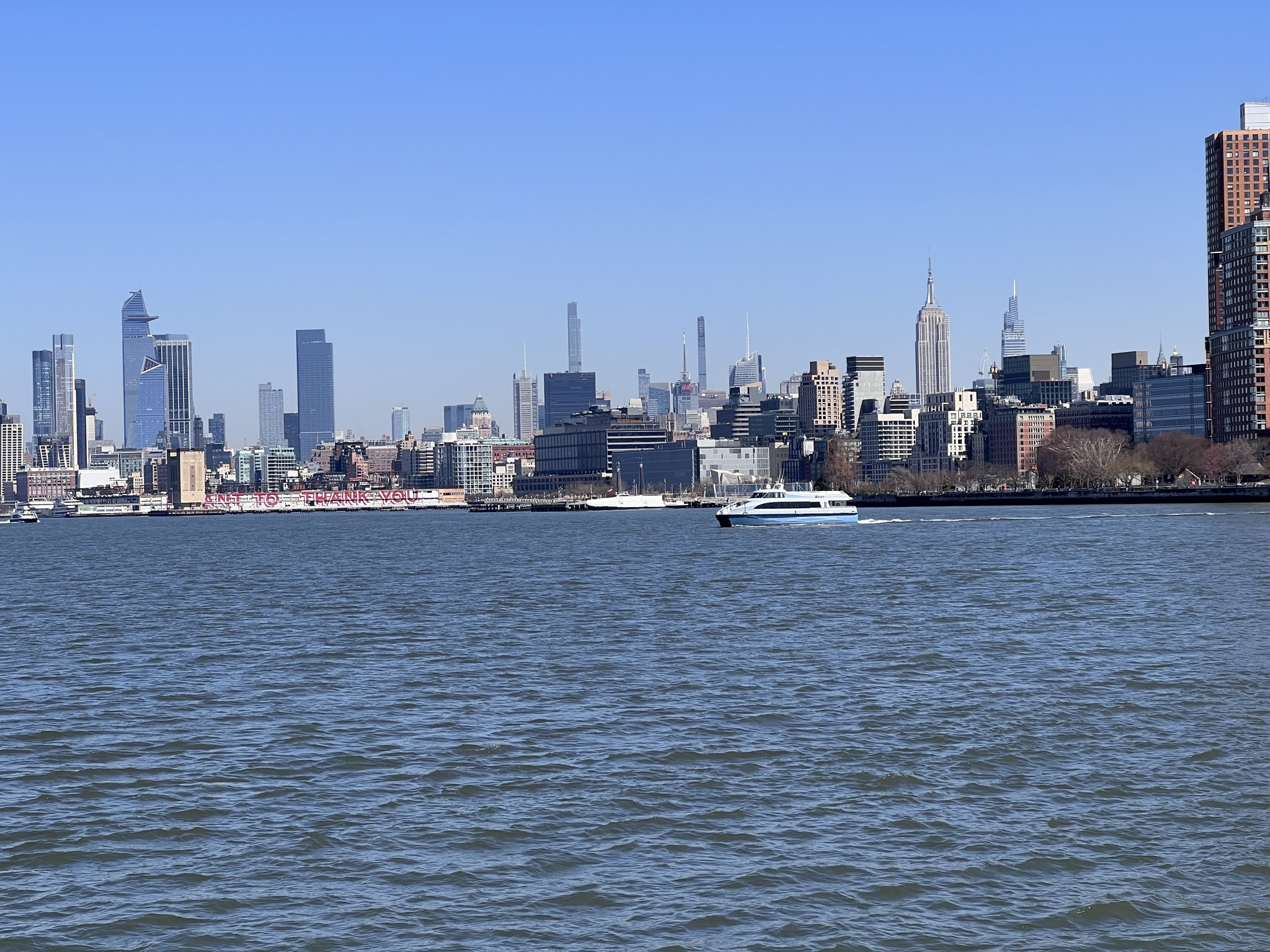
Midtown Manhattan skyline from the ferry

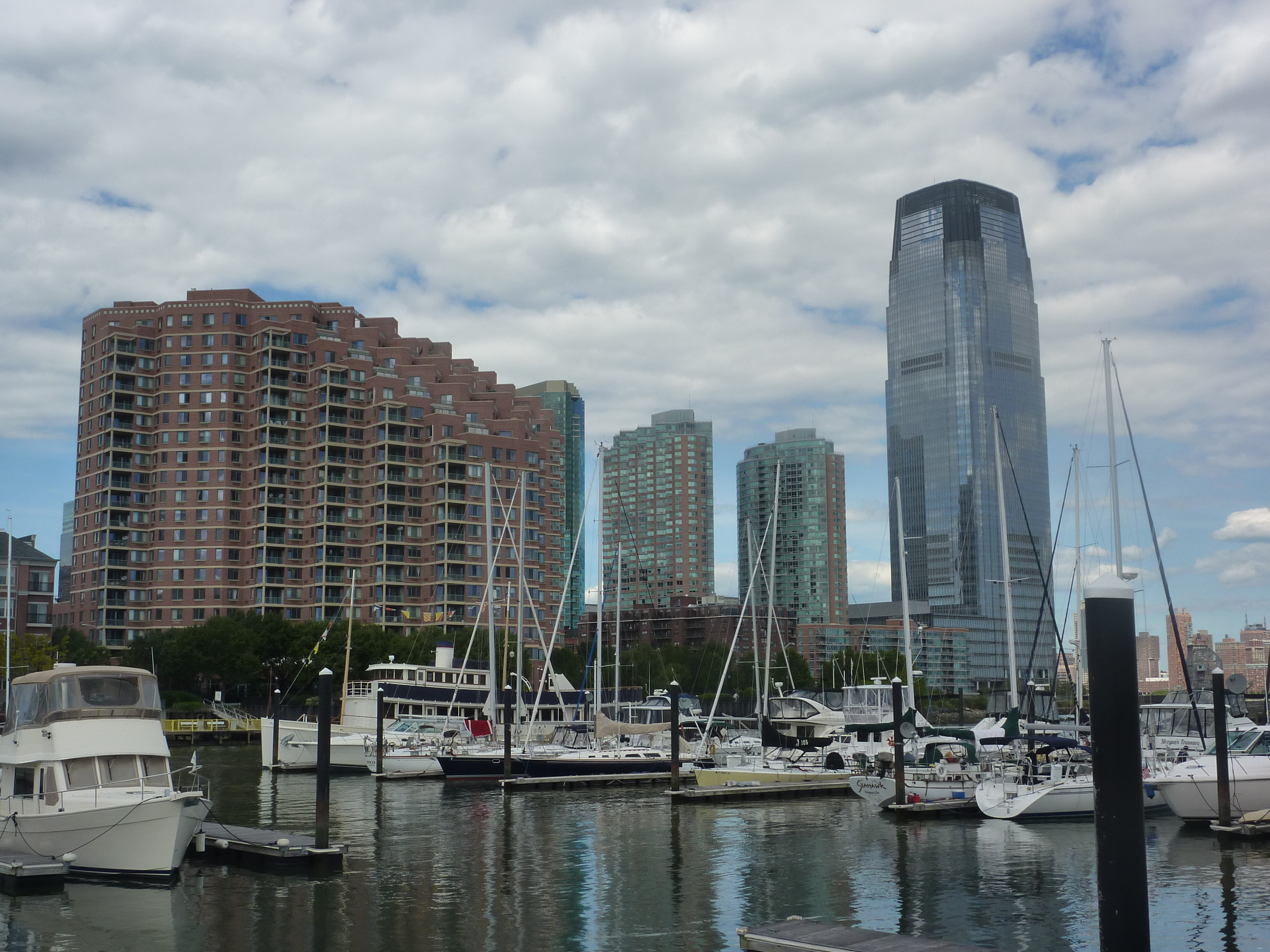
The Morris Canal Basin, where the Liberty Landing Ferry runs

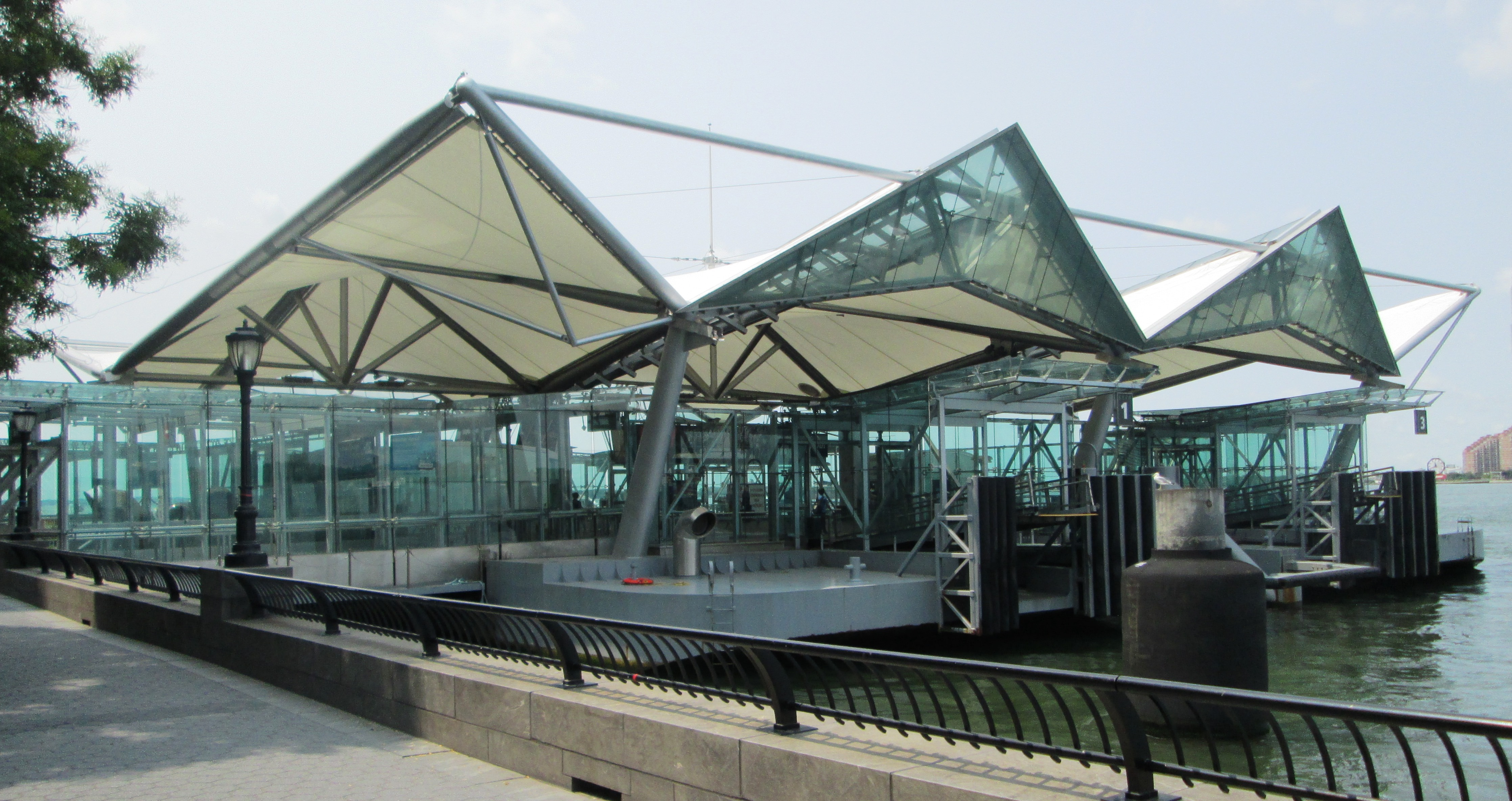
The Battery Park City Ferry Terminal

Service is provided on weekdays (except major holidays). Service has run hourly since 2020, however there was half-hourly service before 2020. Weekend service was provided during the summer up until 2019, however due to COVID-19, summer weekend service was not provided in the summers of 2020, 2021, or 2022. Weekend service has since resumed. All transfers (except transfers involving the free Downtown Connection bus at the Battery Park City Ferry Terminal) are paid as each system runs independently. Fares are $10 one-way from Manhattan to either New Jersey dock, and $2 one way between Warren Street and Liberty Landing. Discounts for seniors and children, as well as ten-trip and monthly passes, are available. Interstate fares were raised from $7 to $10 in January 2023, the first fare hike since at least 2010.

== Route ==
The ferry operates a roughly 15-minute route through the Morris Canal Basin and Hudson River. After leaving the Liberty Landing Marina, the ferry makes the approximately 500 ft (150 m) crossing of the Morris Canal to the Warren Street dock. The ferry then heads out of the Morris Canal Basin, and into the Hudson River, crossing it at its southernmost point, just before it flows into Upper New York Bay. It crosses the river in a northeasterly direction, affording views of the Communipaw Terminal in Liberty State Park, Downtown Jersey City, and Midtown and Downtown Manhattan. It then pulls into the Battery Park City Ferry Terminal, usually utilizing slip 2, which is shared with NYC Ferry's SG Route, as well as NY Waterway services to Port Imperial and Hoboken 14th Street. The ferry then does the same trip in reverse, stops at Warren Street, and terminates back at the Liberty Landing Marina, where the boat lays over for 30 minutes before departing on the next roundtrip.

=== Docks ===
Dock	Fares		
Battery Park City Ferry Terminal at World Financial Center; Foot of Vesey Street; Battery Park City, Manhattan	$10	$10	
Warren Street; Foot of Warren Street; Liberty Harbor, Jersey City	$10	$10	$2
Liberty Landing Marina; Liberty State Park; Jersey City	$10		$2

== Fleet ==
Liberty Landing Ferry operates a fleet of 2 catamarans, the 46-foot (14 m) Little Lady built in 1999 by Sea Taxi Catamarans, and the 64.9-foot (19.8 m) Little Lady II built in 2007, also by Sea Taxi Catamarans, on one route. In regular service, only the Little Lady II operates. Both ferries have top decks with bench seating.

== Ownership and other companies ==
Liberty Landing Ferry is part of Statue City Cruises (which in turn is affiliated with Hornblower Cruises), which also operates ferries to Ellis Island and Liberty Island from Liberty State Park near the Liberty Landing Ferry's slip at the Liberty Landing Marina, and Battery Park in Manhattan. The Battery Park City Ferry Terminal is also used by NY Waterway, NYC Ferry and Seastreak. Other commuter and tourist ferries operating in the Port of New York and New Jersey include the seasonal ferries to Governor's Island, New York Water Taxi, and the Staten Island Ferry. Circle Line Sightseeing Cruises runs sightseeing tours throughout the port.

== See also ==
- List of ferries across the Hudson River to New York City
- North River (Hudson River)
- Lower Manhattan
