= Liberty Harbor =

Populated place in Hudson County, New Jersey, US

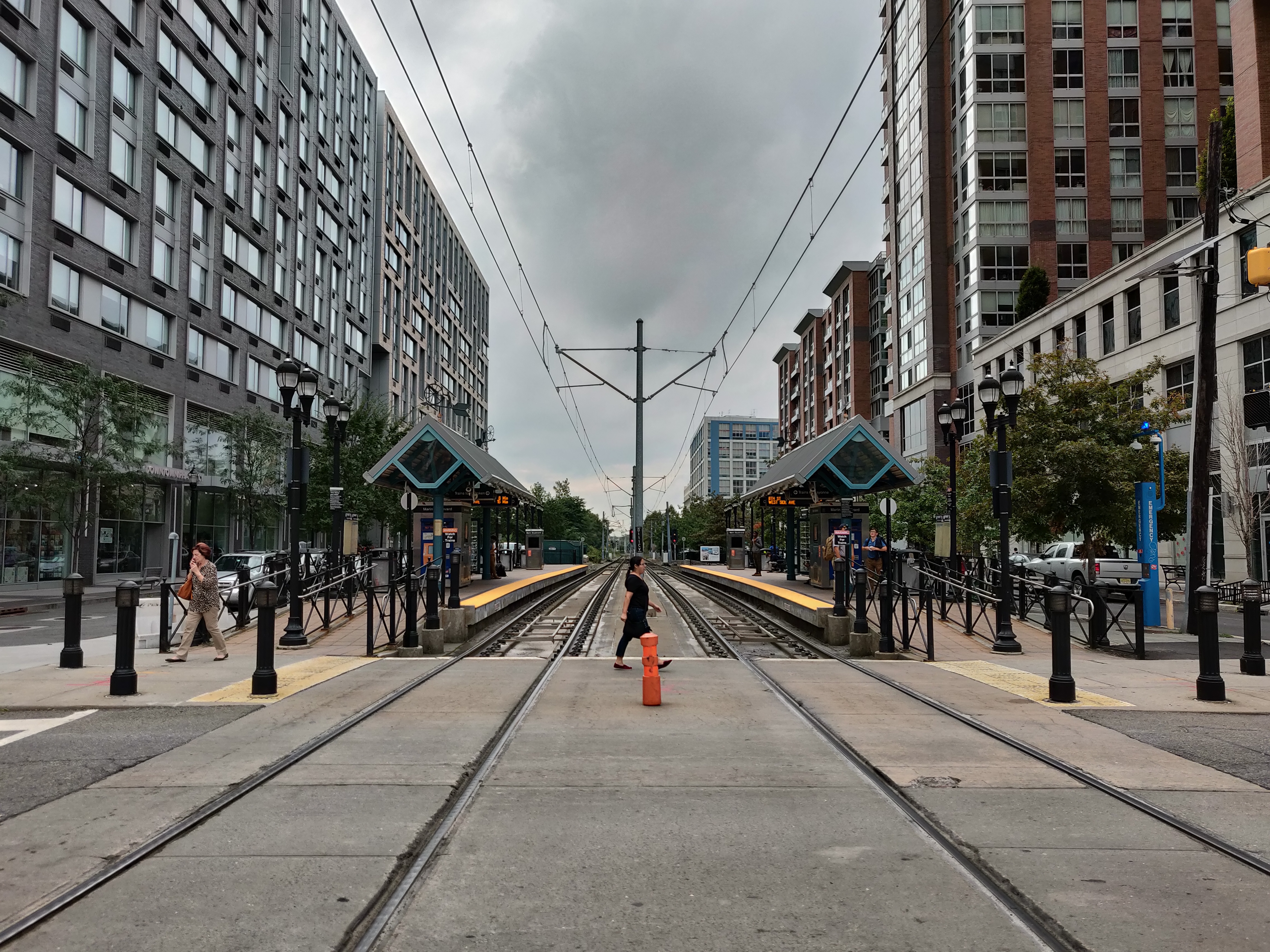
- Marin Boulevard station looking west

- Location of Liberty Harbor in Hudson County, New Jersey
- Coordinates: 40.715391°N 74.048077°W
- Country: United States
- State: New Jersey
- City: Jersey City
- Time zone: Eastern (EST)
  - Summer (DST): Eastern (EDT)
- Website: https://www.libertyharbor.com/

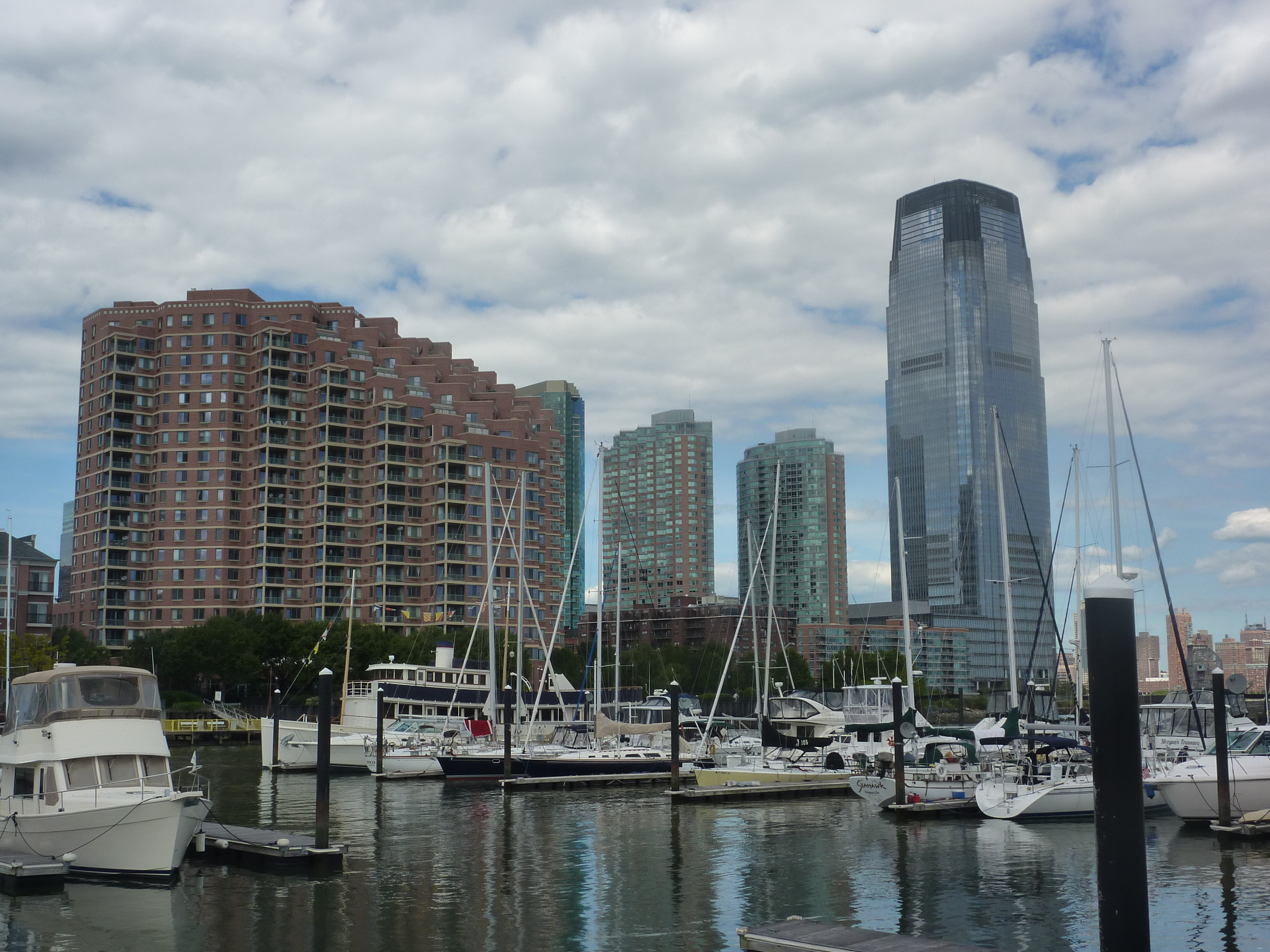
Morris Canal seen from Downtown Jersey City

Liberty Harbor is a neighborhood in Jersey City, New Jersey situated on the Morris Canal's Big Basin opposite Liberty State Park. The approximately 80-acre site consists primarily of landfill and was historically used for industrial activities, including freight transfers between ships and railroads. Before industrial development, the surrounding waterfront included tidal creeks, marshes, and shallow coves - portions of which were later filled.

During the nineteenth century, construction of the Morris Canal accelerated the commercial and industrial development of Jersey City's waterfront. Completed to Jersey City in 1836, the canal connected the waterfront with Pennsylvania's coalfields, supporting shipping, warehousing and manufacturing. Its original eastern terminus was the Little Basin, where cargo could be transferred for shipment across New York Harbor.

Between 1859 and 1860, the Morris Canal and Banking Company constructed a larger basin immediately south of the canal's terminus. Known as the Big Basin or Tidewater Basin, it served as a holding area for barges awaiting access to the canal.

Railroad expansion subsequently transformed the surrounding shoreline. The Lehigh Valley Railroad leased the Morris Canal in 1871 and acquired land along the southern shore of the Tidewater Basin in 1872. By the late nineteenth century, the basin was bordered by the railroad facilities, pivate industries and maritime businesses.

The current harbor was originally conceived in the 1970s to replace disused land and brownfields.

The neighborhood masterplan follows concepts of new urbanism; the masterplan was originally created by architectural firm Duany and Plater-Zyberk.

The Marin Boulevard station and Jersey Avenue station of the Hudson–Bergen Light Rail serve the neighborhood, and the Grove Street PATH station with service to New York City and Newark is a short walk. A NY Waterway ferry route between Lower Manhattan and Liberty Harbor was inaugurated in 2009. Liberty Landing Ferry operates from the foot of Warren Street.

== See also ==
- Downtown Jersey City
- Hudson Waterfront
