= Essex Street station (Hudson–Bergen Light Rail) =

Light Rail Station in Jersey City, New Jersey

Essex Street
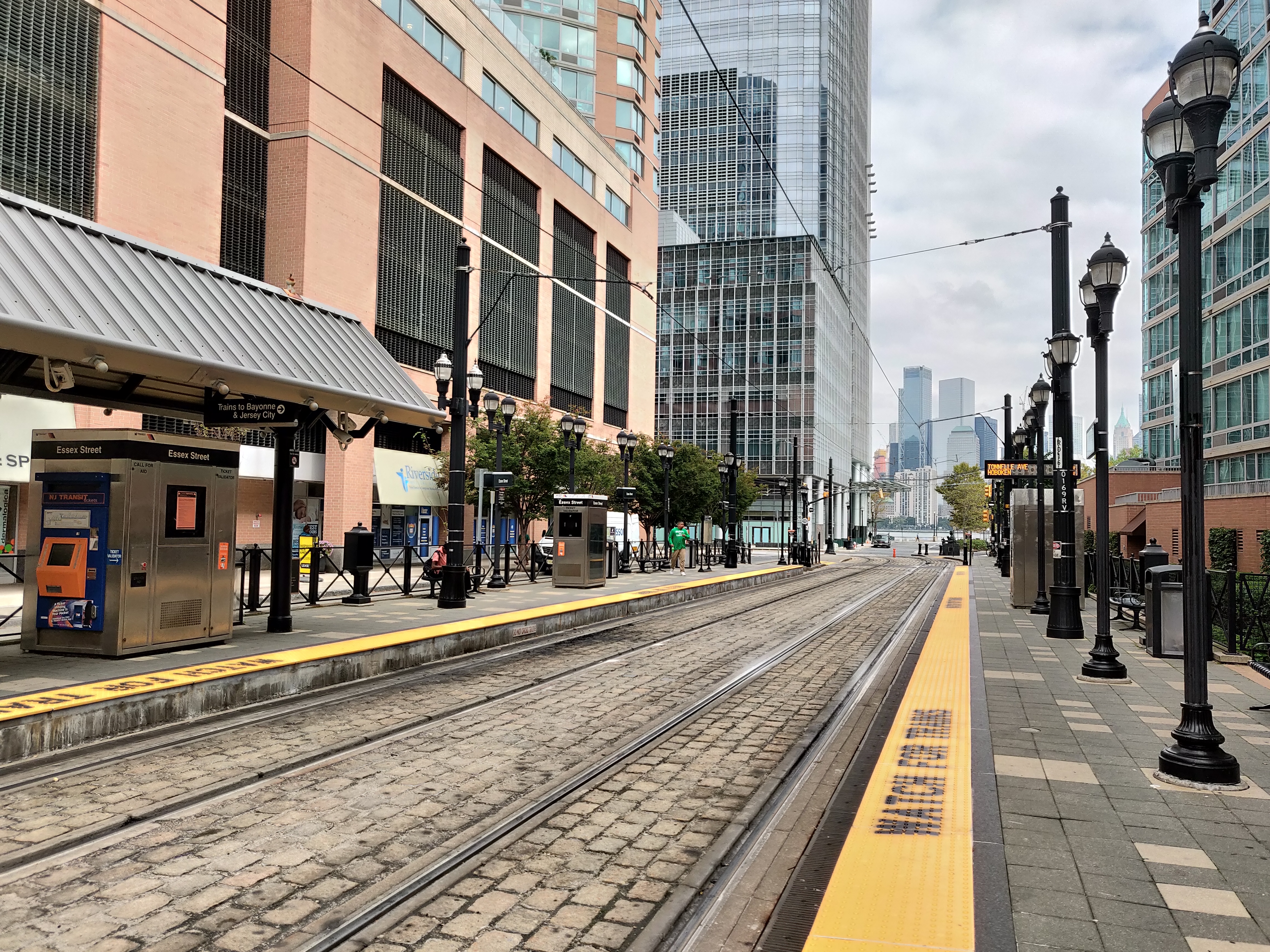
- Essex Street station platforms

General information
- Location: Essex Street and Greene Street; Jersey City, New Jersey
- Coordinates: 40°42′46″N 74°02′09″W
- Owner: New Jersey Transit
- Platforms: 2 side platforms
- Tracks: 2
- Connections: NY Waterway; Liberty Water Taxi

Construction
- Cycle facilities: Yes
- Accessible: Yes

Other information
- Fare zone: 1

History
- Opened: April 15, 2000

Passengers
- 2025: 1,298 (average weekday)
- Rank: 19 of 24

Services
Preceding station	NJ Transit	Following station
Marin Boulevard toward West Side Avenue	West Side–Tonnelle	Exchange Place toward Tonnelle Avenue
Marin Boulevard toward 8th Street	Bayonne–Hoboken	Exchange Place toward Hoboken
Liberty State Park toward 8th Street	Bayonne Flyer	Exchange Place toward Hoboken
Location

Essex Street station is a station on the Hudson–Bergen Light Rail (HBLR) located between Hudson and Greene Streets in Jersey City, New Jersey. There are two tracks and two side platforms.

The station opened on April 15, 2000. Northbound service from the station is available to Hoboken Terminal and Tonnelle Avenue in North Bergen.

== Gallery ==
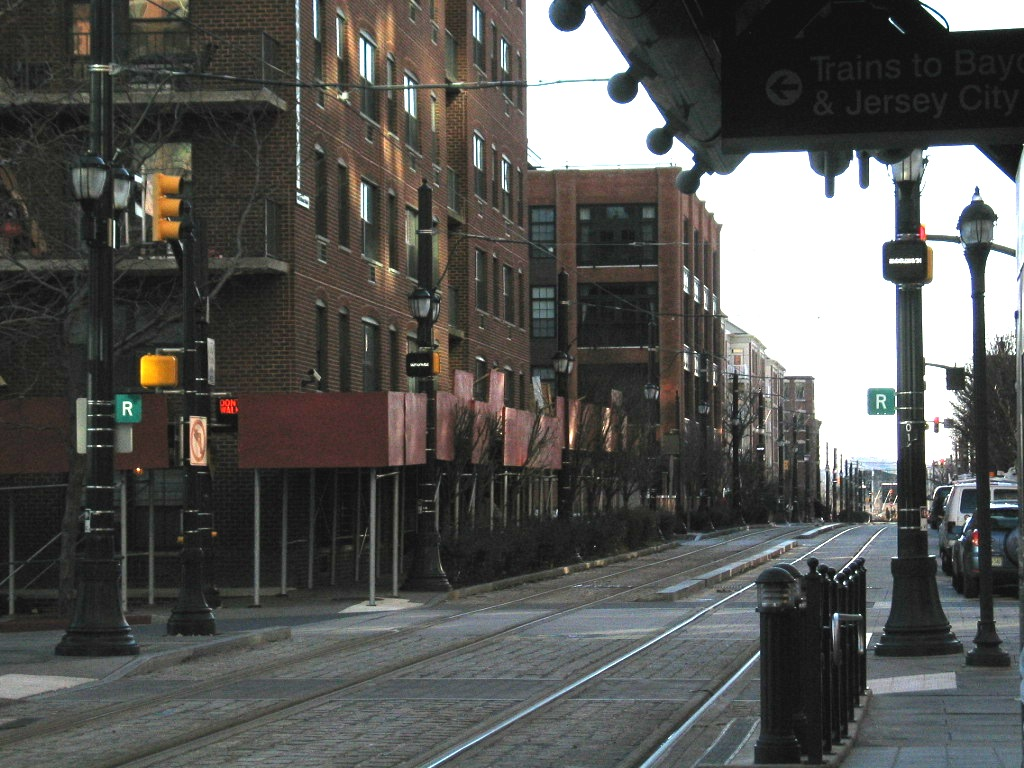
Looking westbound towards Liberty State Park

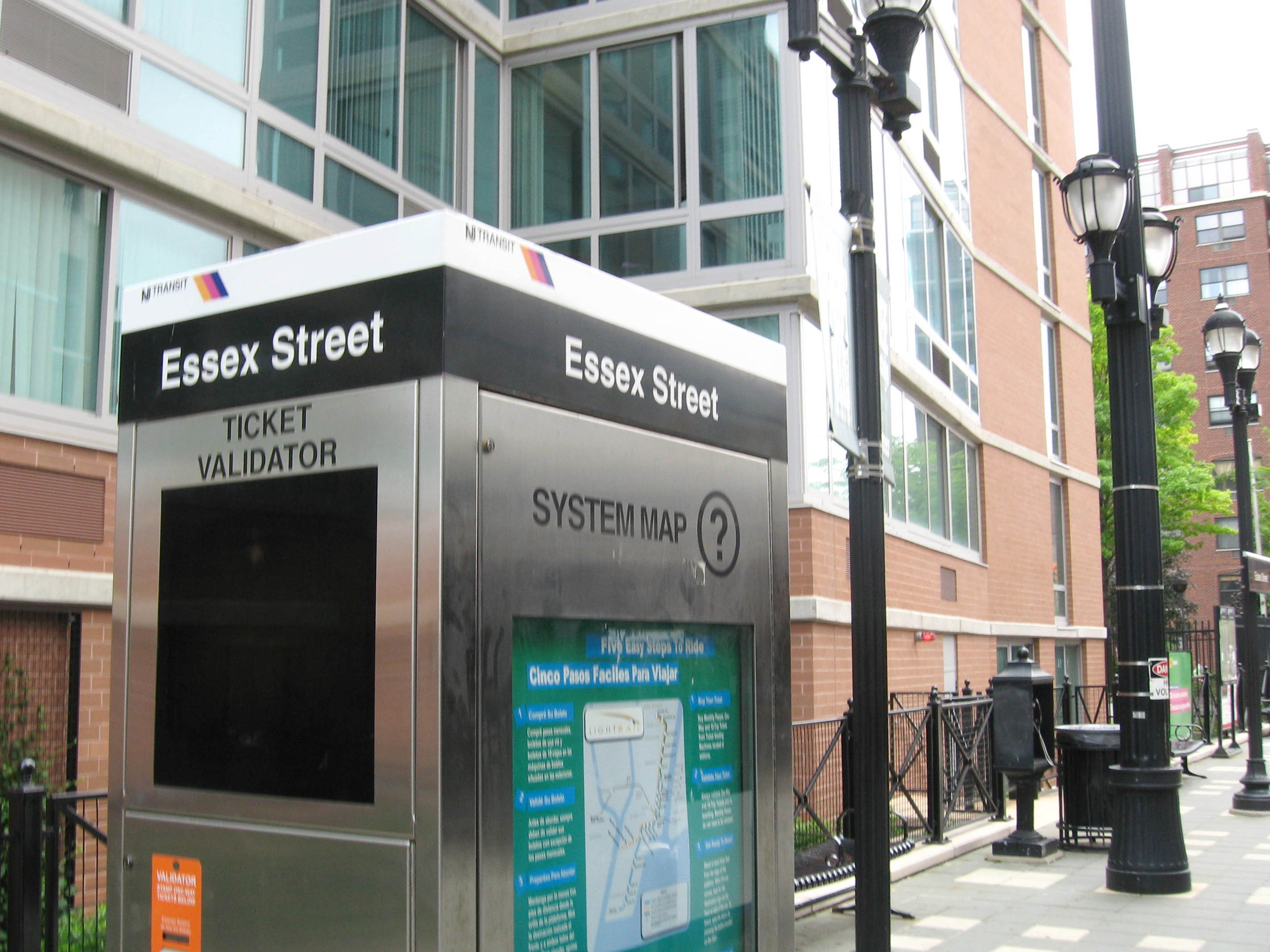
Looking south on the northbound platform

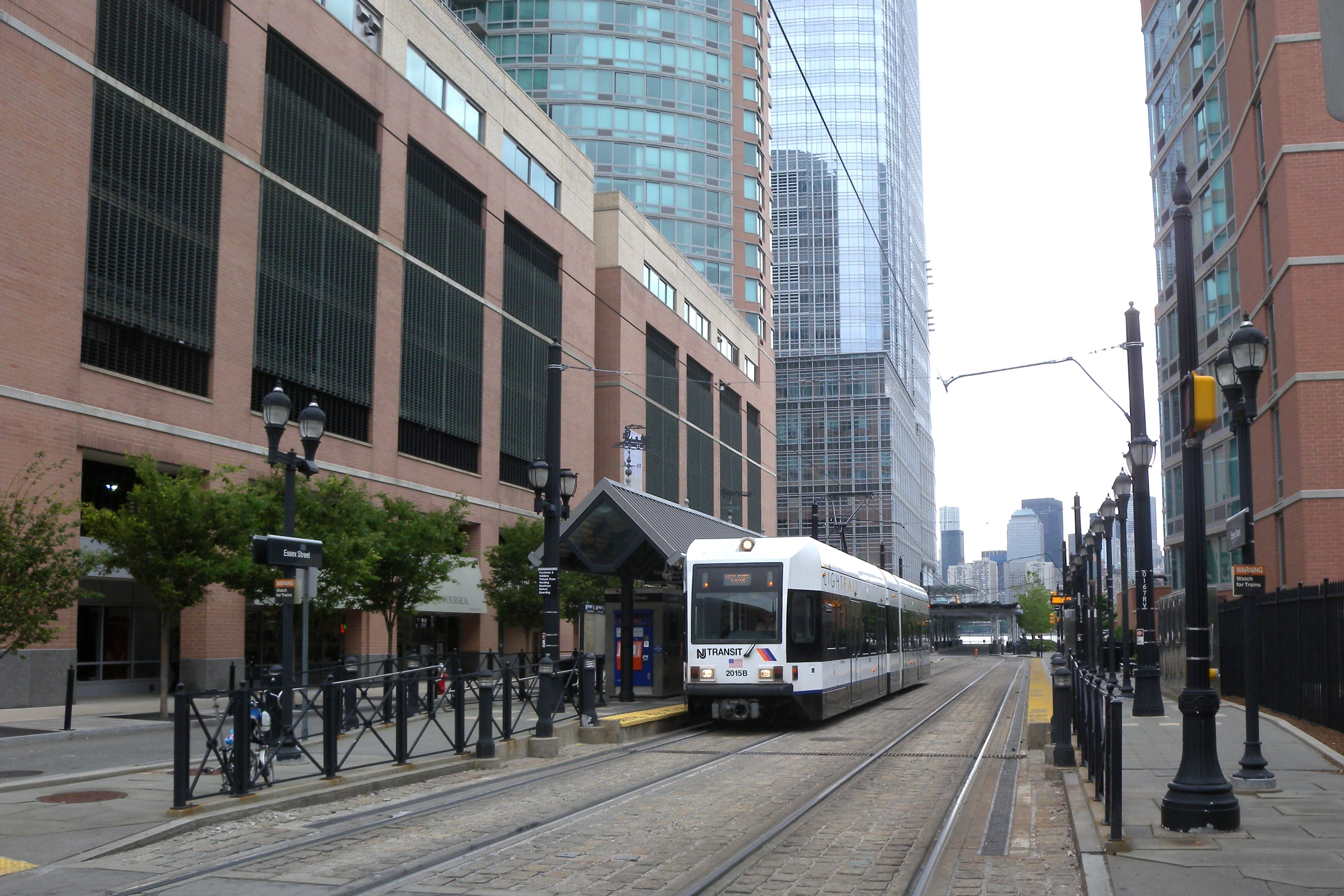
Looking east along Essex Street at westbound trolley with Liberty View Towers in background on a cloudy morning.

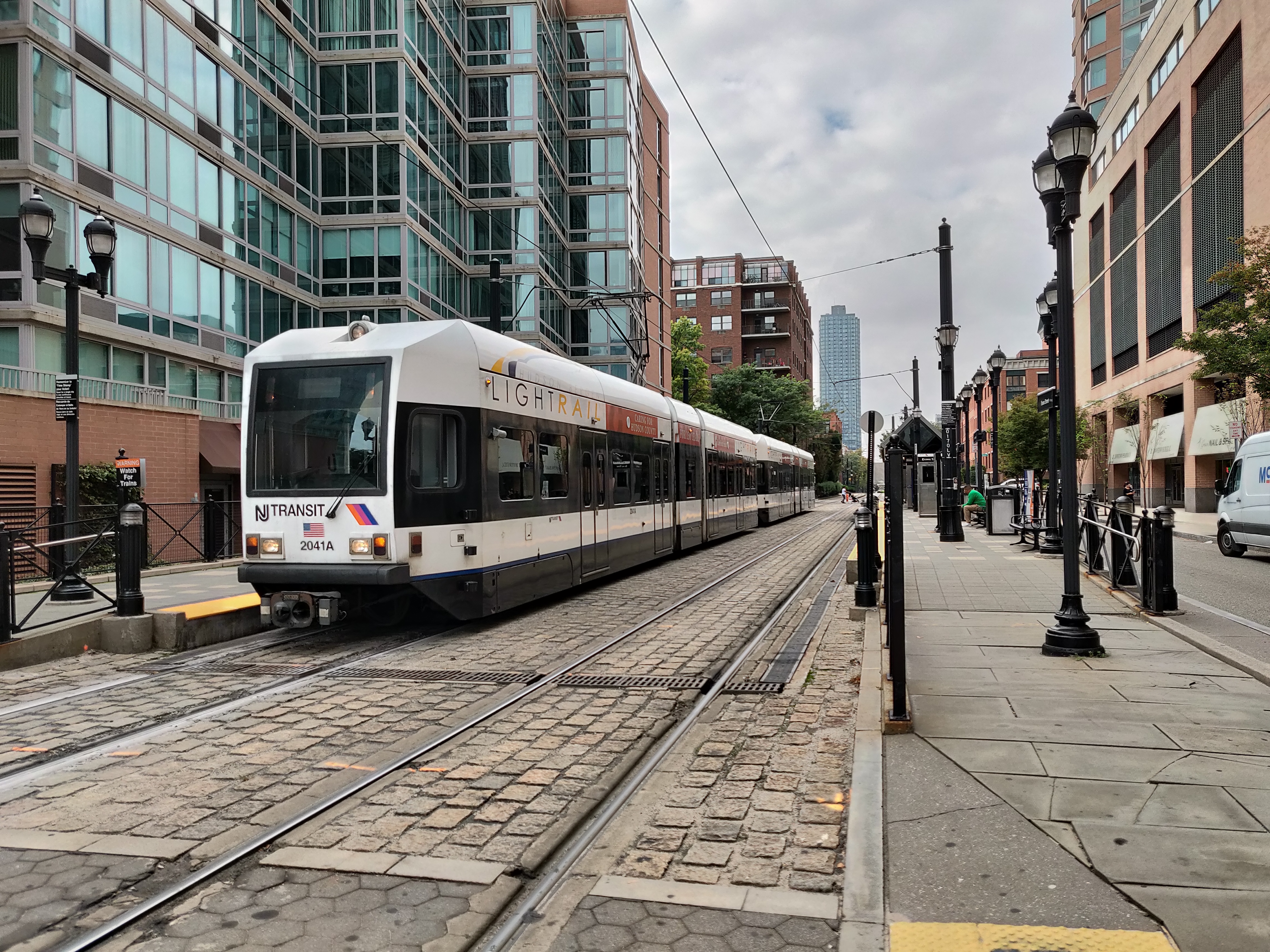
A trolley on the northbound platform
