= Exchange Place station (Hudson–Bergen Light Rail) =

Hudson–Bergen Light Rail station in Jersey City, New Jersey

Exchange Place
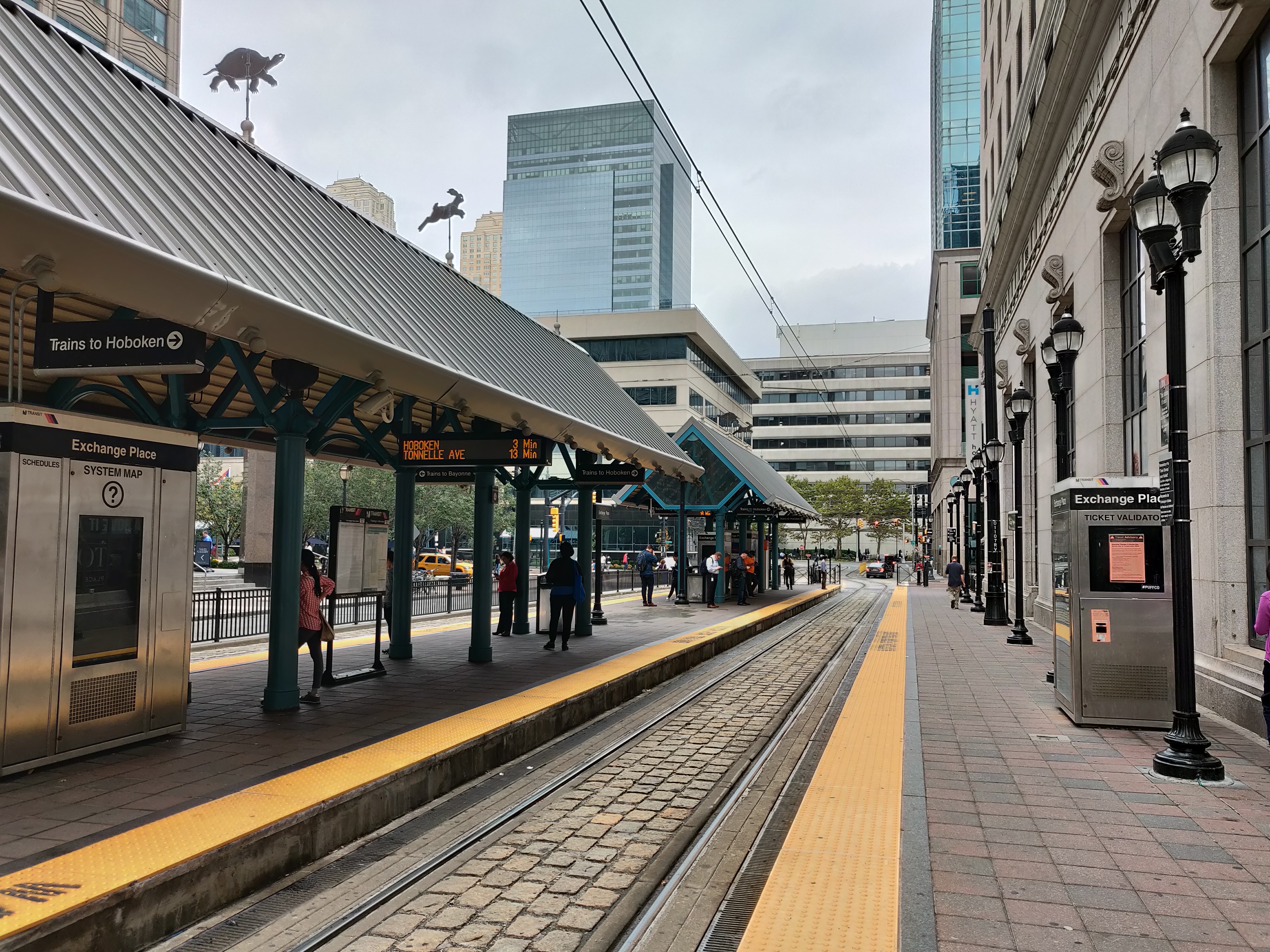
- Exchange Place station platforms, facing north

General information
- Location: Hudson Street and Exchange Place; Jersey City, New Jersey
- Coordinates: 40°42′58″N 74°02′03″W
- Owner: New Jersey Transit
- Platforms: 1 island platform, 1 side platform
- Tracks: 2
- Connections: NJ Transit Bus: 1, 63, 64, 68, 80, 81, 82, 86; PATH at Exchange Place; NY Waterway

Construction
- Cycle facilities: Yes
- Accessible: Yes

Other information
- Fare zone: 1

History
- Opened: April 15, 2000

Passengers
- 2025: 6,090 (average weekday)
- Rank: 1 of 24

Services
Preceding station	NJ Transit	Following station
Essex Street toward West Side Avenue	West Side–Tonnelle	Harborside toward Tonnelle Avenue
Essex Street toward 8th Street	Bayonne–Hoboken	Harborside toward Hoboken
Essex Street toward 8th Street	Bayonne Flyer	Harborside toward Hoboken
Location

Exchange Place station is a light rail station in Jersey City, New Jersey. Located on Hudson Street between York and Montgomery Streets, the station services trains of New Jersey Transit's Hudson–Bergen Light Rail between Bayonne and North Bergen. Exchange Place station is located near the PATH station of the same name. The station consists of two platforms, an island platform for trains in both directions, along with a side platform that services northbound trains only. The next station to the south is Essex Street station, while the next station to the north is Harborside.

The station marked the terminus of the original opening segment of the Hudson–Bergen Light Rail from 34th Street station in Bayonne and West Side Avenue in Jersey City. In 2017, the platforms at the station were extended by 25 feet (7.6 m) to their current length of 190 feet (58 m). The work was done to accommodate new "extended" cars that were introduced to ease overcrowding during peak periods of ridership.

== Gallery ==
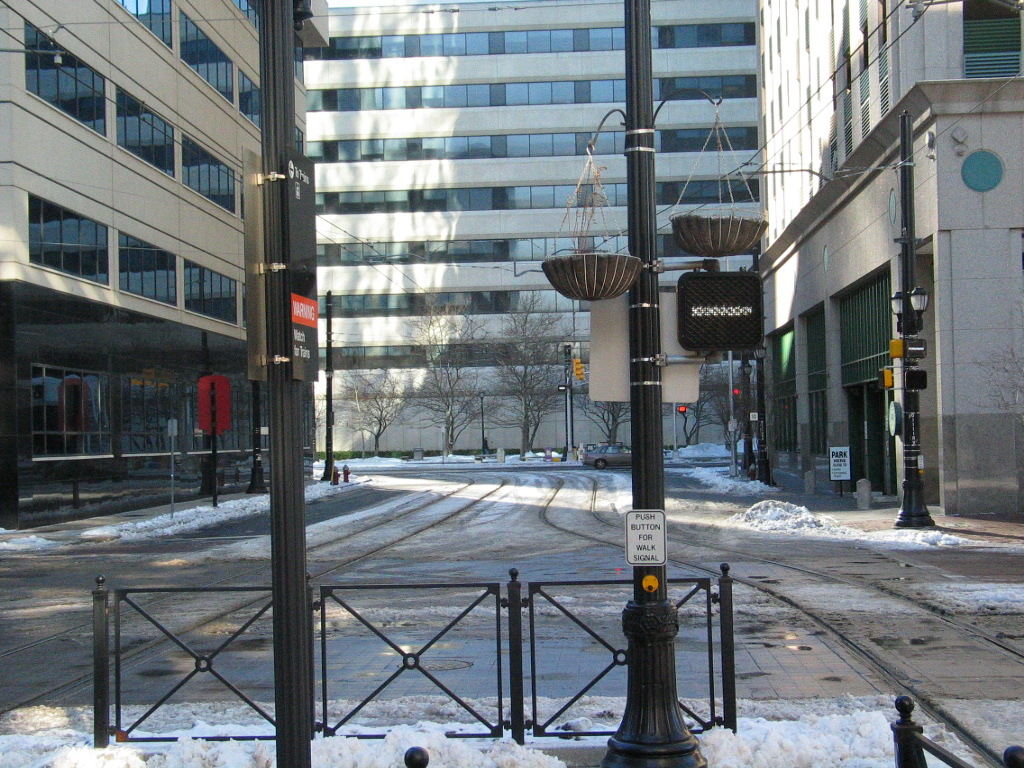
View near Montgomery Street in January 2004

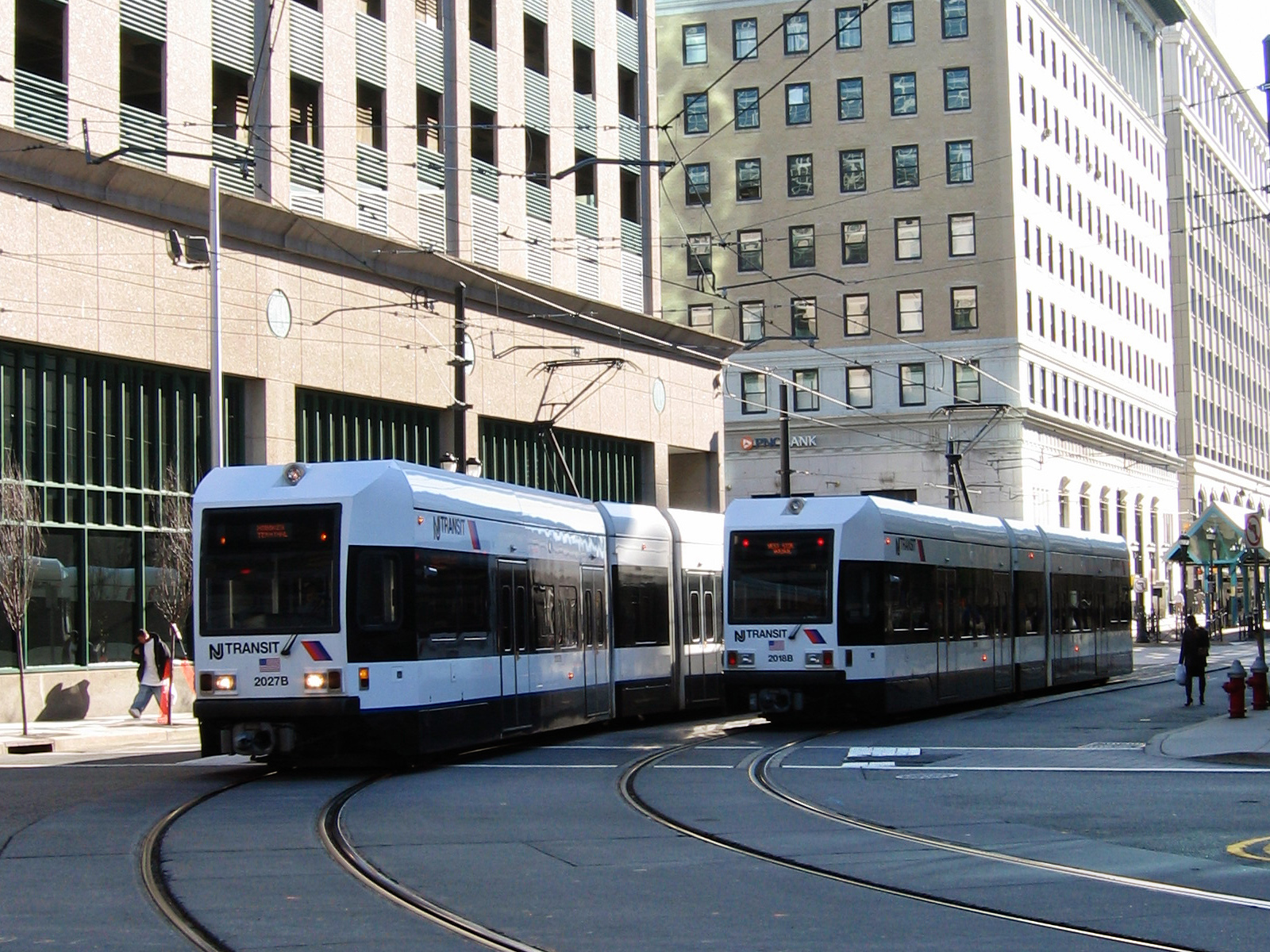
Two trains at Exchange Place

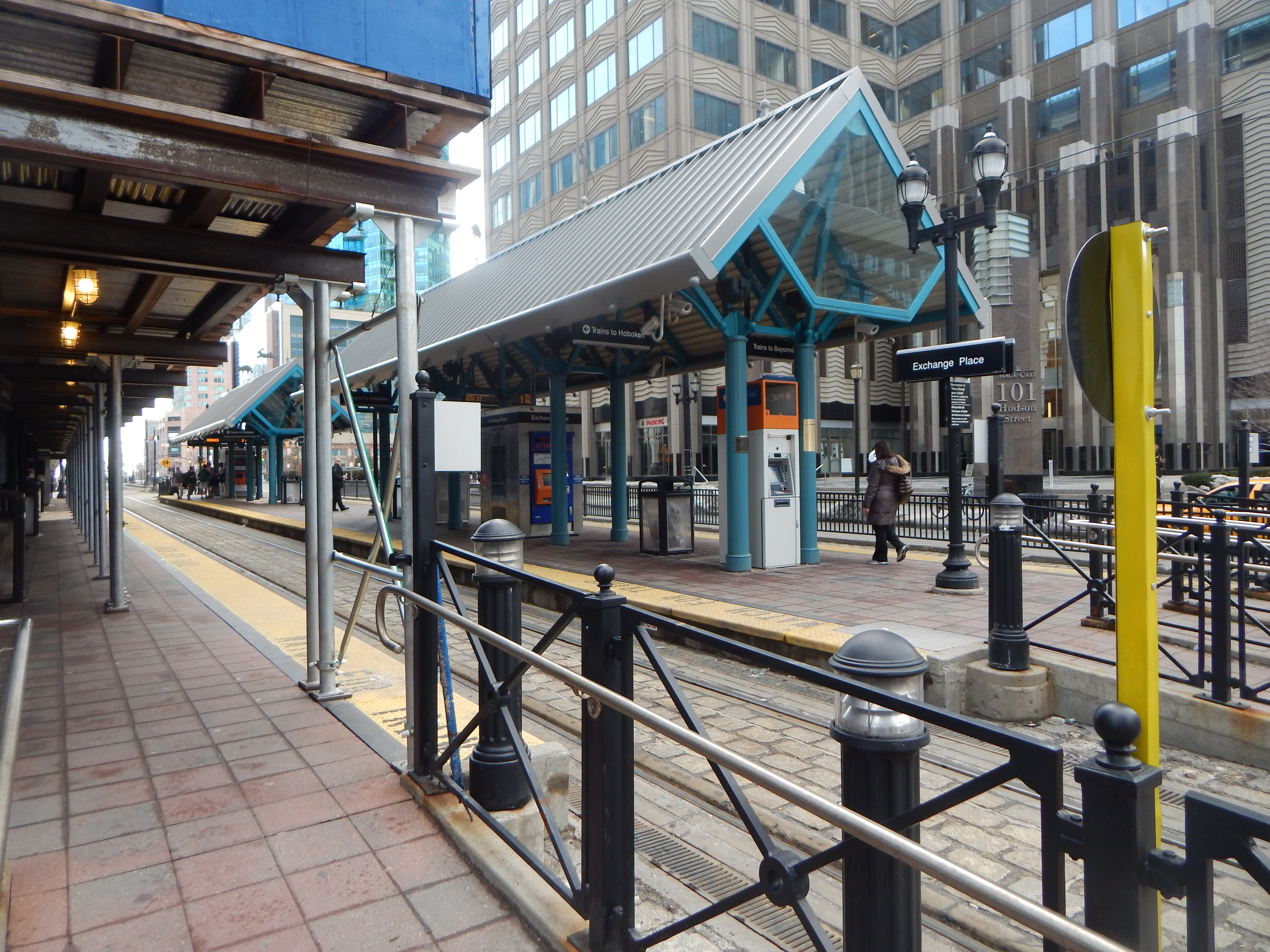
The station in March 2015, with the northbound platform under scaffolding.

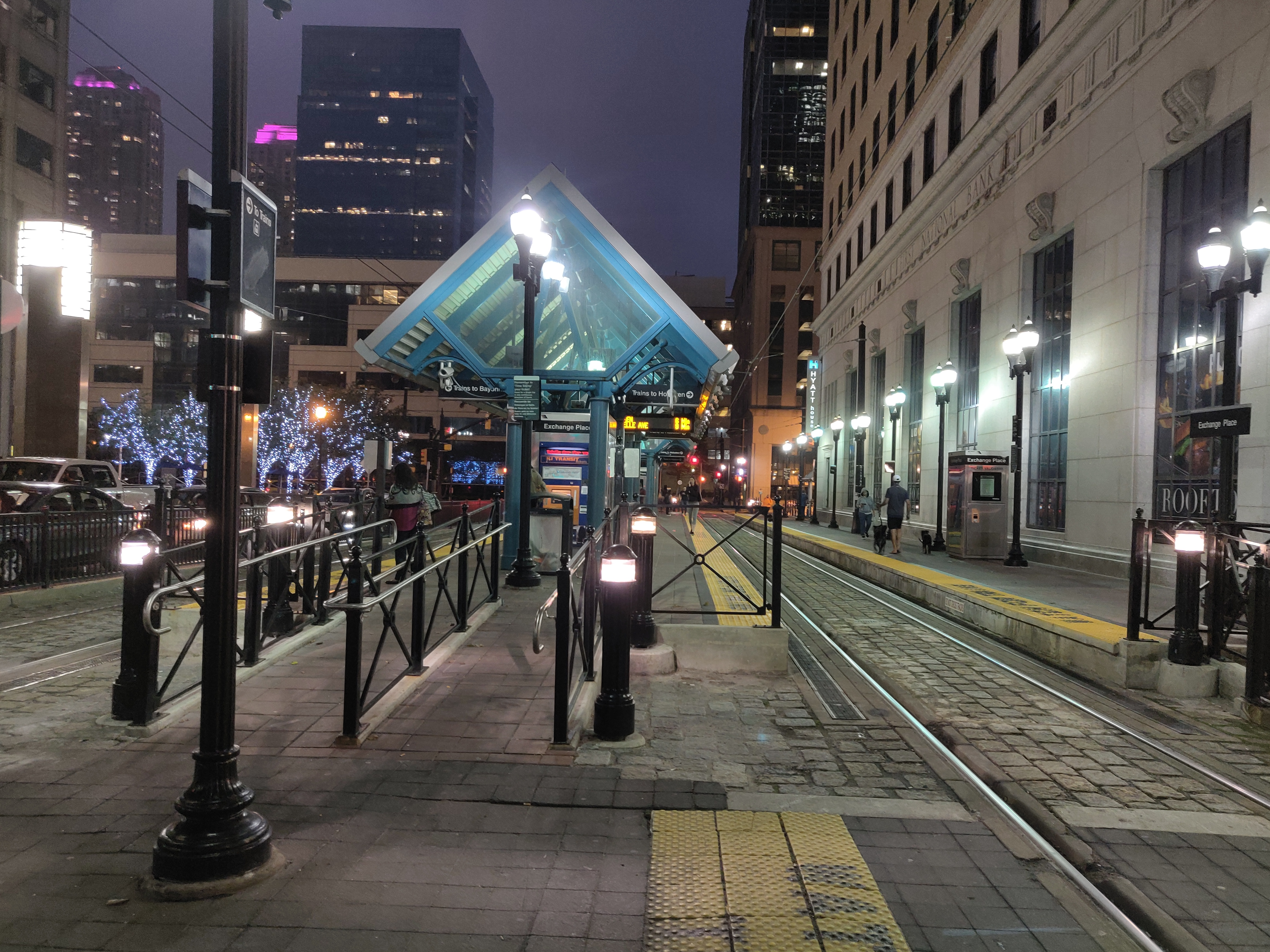
The station in the evening in October 2018
