= New Jersey Turnpike =

Toll highway in the United States

New Jersey Turnpike
- New Jersey Turnpike and spurs (in green)

Route information
- Maintained by NJTA
- Length: 117.20 mi (188.62 km) (Mainline): 11.03 mi (17.75 km)—Western Spur; 6.55 mi (10.54 km)—Pennsylvania Extension; 8.17 mi (13.15 km)—Newark Bay Extension; 5.20 mi (8.37 km)—Interstate 95 Extension; 148.18 mi (238.47 km)—Total length of Turnpike including extensions
- Existed: 1951–present
- History: Completed 1952
- Component highways: I-295 in Pennsville Township; Route 700 (unsigned) from Pennsville Township to Mansfield Township; I-95 from Mansfield Township to Fort Lee; I-78 Newark Bay Extension from Newark to Jersey City
- Restrictions: Commercial vehicles must use outer roadways between exits 6 and 14-14C

Major junctions
- South end: I-295 Toll / US 40 in Pennsville Township
- I-295 / US 130 / Route 49 in Pennsville Township; US 40 / Route 140 / CR 540 in Carneys Point Township; Route 73 in Mount Laurel; I-95 Toll / Pearl Harbor Extension in Mansfield Township; I-195 in Robbinsville Township; I-287 / Route 440 / CR 514 in Edison; G.S. Parkway in Woodbridge Township; I-278 / Route 439 in Elizabeth; I-78 / Newark Bay Extension in Newark; I-280 in Kearny; Route 495 / CR 681 in Secaucus; I-80 / CR 56 in Teaneck
- North end: I-95 / US 1-9 / US 46 / US 9W in Fort Lee

Location
- Country: United States
- State: New Jersey
- Counties: Salem, Gloucester, Camden, Burlington, Mercer, Middlesex, Union, Essex, Hudson, Bergen

Highway system
- New Jersey State Highway Routes; Interstate; US; State; Scenic Byways
← I-695	Route 700	→ I-895
← I-95	Route 100	→ Route 101
← I-295	Route 300	→ Route 303

The New Jersey Turnpike (NJTP) is a system of controlled-access toll roads in the U.S. state of New Jersey. The turnpike is maintained by the New Jersey Turnpike Authority (NJTA). (Note: The Garden State Parkway, although maintained by the New Jersey Turnpike Authority, is not considered part of the turnpike.) The 117.2-mile (188.6 km) mainline's southern terminus is at the Delaware Memorial Bridge on Interstate 295 (I-295) in Pennsville Township. Its northern terminus is at an interchange with U.S. Route 46 (US 46) in Ridgefield Park. Construction of the mainline, from concept to completion, took a total of 22 months between 1950 and 1951. It was opened to traffic on November 5, 1951, between its southern terminus and exit 10.

The turnpike is a major thoroughfare providing access to various localities in New Jersey, and provides a direct bypass southeast of Philadelphia for long-distance travelers between New York City and Washington, D.C. According to the International Bridge, Tunnel and Turnpike Association, the turnpike is the nation's sixth-busiest toll road, and one of the most heavily traveled highways in the nation.

The northern part of the mainline turnpike, along with all its extensions and spurs, is a part of the Interstate Highway System. It is designated I-95 from exit 6 in Mansfield Township to its northern end near New York City. South of exit 6, it has the unsigned Route 700 designation. There are three extensions and two spurs, including the Newark Bay Extension at exit 14, which carries I-78; the Pennsylvania Turnpike Extension, officially known as the Pearl Harbor Memorial Turnpike Extension, at exit 6, which carries I-95 off the mainline turnpike; the Eastern Spur and the Western Spur, which split traffic between Newark and Ridgefield; and the Interstate 95 Extension, which continues the mainline to the George Washington Bridge approach in Fort Lee. All segments (excluding the I-95 Extension) are toll roads.

The route is divided into four roadways between exit 6 and exit 14. The inner lanes are generally restricted to cars, while the outer lanes are open to cars, trucks, and buses. The turnpike has 12-foot-wide (3.7 m) lanes, 10-foot-wide (3.0 m) shoulders, and 12 of the highway's service areas are named after notable New Jersey residents. The Interstate Highway System took some of its design guidelines from those of the turnpike. The turnpike has been referenced many times in music, film, and television.

== Route description ==
Time-lapse video of a southbound trip on the New Jersey Turnpike in 2014

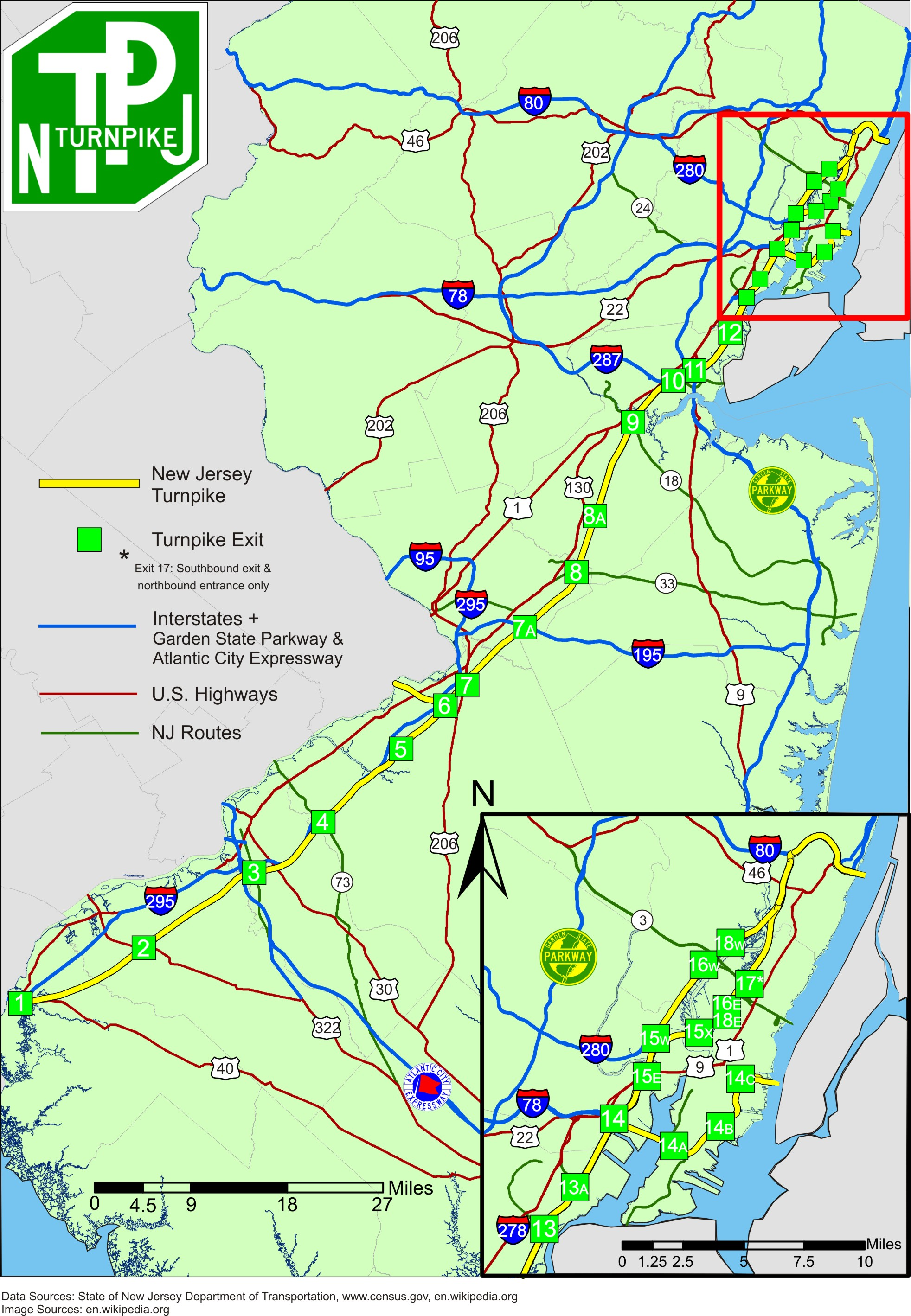
Map of the New Jersey Turnpike, including interchange locations and other highways in New Jersey

The mainline of the New Jersey Turnpike splits from I-295 in Pennsville Township and runs along a north-northeast route to I-80 and US 46 in Ridgefield Park, where it continues north as I-95. It is designated Route 700, an unsigned route, from exit 1 (Delaware Memorial Bridge) to exit 6, and as I-95 from exit 6 (Mansfield Township) to exit 18 (Secaucus–Carlstadt). The number of lanes ranges from four lanes south of exit 4 (Mount Laurel), six lanes between exit 4 and exit 6 (Mansfield Township), 12 lanes between exit 6 and exit 11 (Woodbridge Township), and 14 lanes between exit 11 and exit 14 (Newark). The default speed limit is 65 miles per hour (105 km/h) between the southern terminus and milepost 97, and 55 miles per hour (89 km/h) from there to the northern terminus. The Newark Bay Extension carries a 50-mile-per-hour (80 km/h) limit. The turnpike has variable speed limit signs allowing for the limit to be lowered temporarily during unusual road conditions.

Before the advent of the Interstate Highway System, the entire turnpike was designated by the New Jersey Department of Transportation (NJDOT) as Route 700. The Pearl Harbor Memorial Turnpike Extension was Route 700P, and the Newark Bay Extension was Route 700N. None of these state highway designations have been signed. The entire length of the New Jersey Turnpike is part of the National Highway System, a network of roads important to the country's economy, defense, and mobility.

=== Pennsville Township to Springfield Township ===
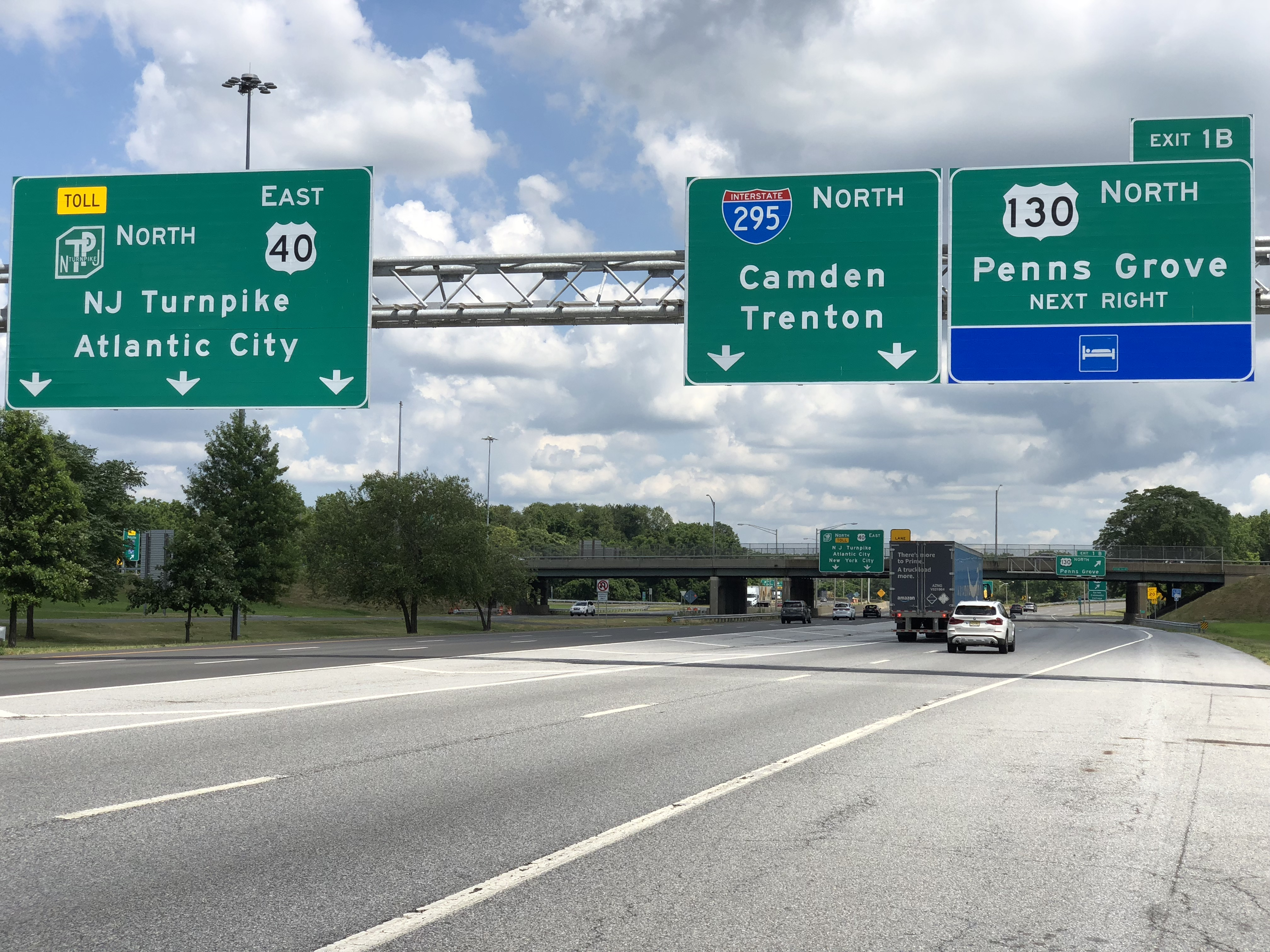
Signage at the turnpike's split with Interstate 295 in Pennsville Township

The turnpike's southern terminus lies at the Delaware Memorial Bridge in Pennsville Township, running concurrently with I-295 and US 40. At an interchange that provides access to Route 49 and US 130, I-295 splits from the turnpike. A short distance later, in Carneys Point Township, the turnpike enters an interchange with Route 140 and County Route 540 (CR 540); US 40 splits from the turnpike here, using the last exit before turnpike toll.

Through this section, the turnpike has three northbound lanes and two southbound lanes. The turnpike loses its third northbound lane, and continues on with two lanes in each direction and a 65 mph (105 km/h) speed limit. After crossing over Game Creek, the turnpike reaches the exit 1 toll plaza, where northbound drivers must obtain a ticket, and southbound drivers must surrender their ticket and pay the proper toll. Two Express E-ZPass lanes are provided in each direction. Paralleling I-295, the turnpike continues east-northeast through rural Salem County with two lanes in each direction. After passing under Route 48, the turnpike enters Oldmans Township, where it has the John Fenwick Service Area northbound and the Clara Barton Service Area southbound. The turnpike then briefly enters Pilesgrove Township before crossing the Oldmans Creek into Woolwich Township.

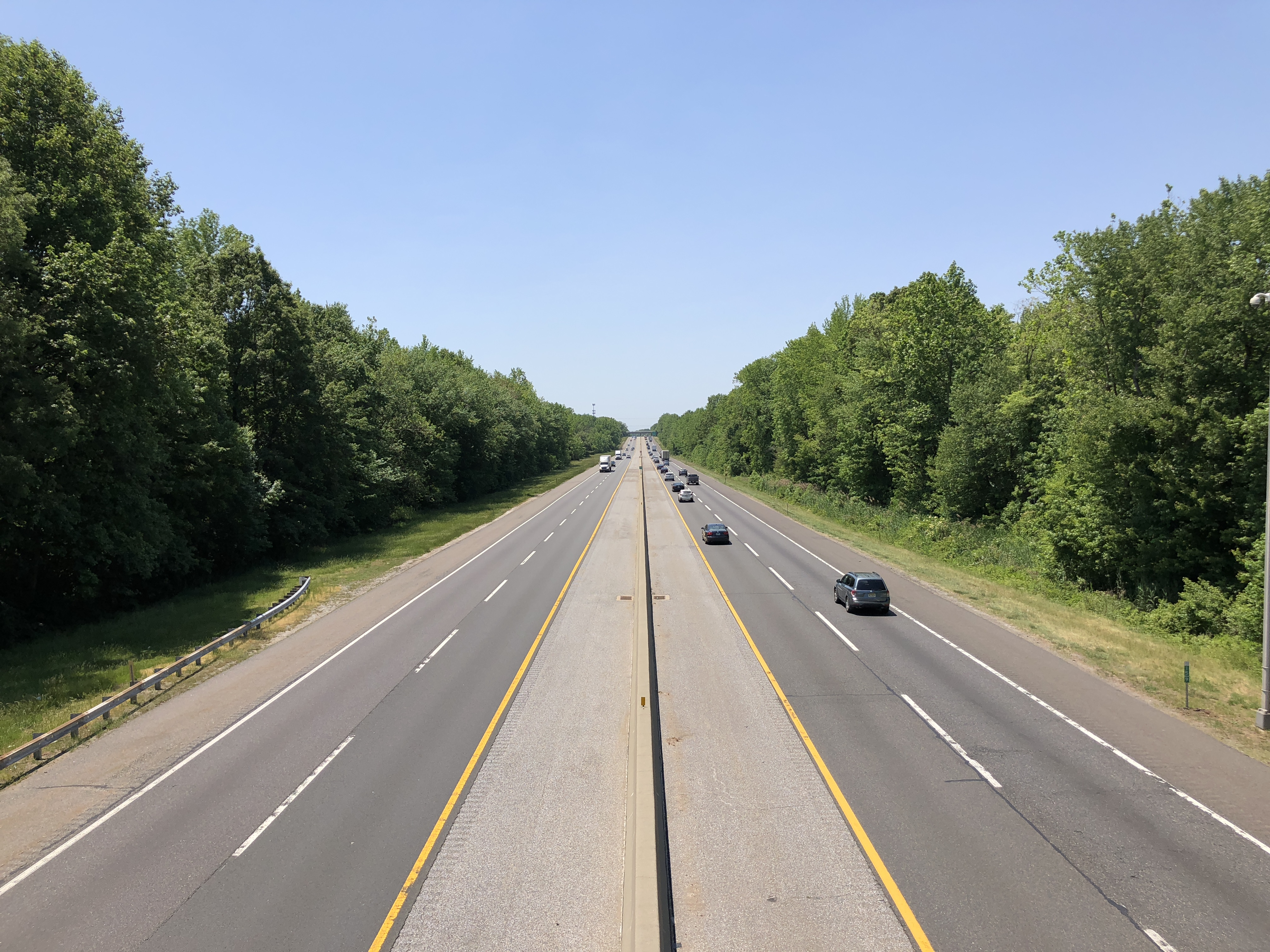
View south along the New Jersey Turnpike in East Greenwich Township

Continuing northeast, the turnpike crosses the SMS Rail Lines' Salem Branch before passing to the south of Swedesboro. After crossing the Raccoon Creek, the highway reaches an interchange for US 322. A maintenance yard is present on the northbound side of the turnpike immediately north of the interchange into Harrison Township. The route heads northeast into East Greenwich Township past farmland before crossing Edwards Creek. Here, the turnpike passes by residential developments and soon crosses the Mantua Creek into West Deptford Township, where it passes through parkland before development near the route increases substantially. After passing under Mantua Pike (Route 45), the turnpike enters Woodbury Heights, where it passes by homes before crossing Conrail Shared Assets Operations' (CSAO) Vineland Secondary and entering Deptford Township. Here, the turnpike passes under Route 47 before crossing the Big Timber Creek. Immediately northeast of this point, the turnpike passes under the Route 42 freeway and enters Bellmawr in Camden County. After passing to the south of an industrial park, the turnpike enters Runnemede and comes to an exit for Black Horse Pike (Route 168), serving Camden to the north and providing access to the Atlantic City Expressway to the south. Immediately after the interchange, the turnpike crosses back into Bellmawr before entering Barrington, where it passes under Route 41/CR 573. The turnpike then passes near packaging plants before entering Lawnside where it passes over CSAO's Beesleys Point Secondary and crossing over White Horse Pike (US 30).

Still two lanes in each direction, the turnpike continues northeast past a warehouse and eventually comes within yards of I-295. Upon entering Cherry Hill, the turnpike passes over tracks carrying the PATCO Speedline and NJ Transit's Atlantic City Line before reaching the Walt Whitman Service Area along the southbound lanes. Continuing northeast, the turnpike passes under Route 70 before crossing the Pennsauken Creek into Mount Laurel, Burlington County, where it has an exit for Route 73. North of this point, the turnpike has three lanes in each direction. Still running within close proximity of I-295, the turnpike comes to a New Jersey State Police station and passes under Route 38 before crossing CSAO's Pemberton Industrial Track. After the northbound James Fenimore Cooper Service Area, the road crosses over Rancocas Creek and passes to the northwest of Rancocas State Park. Now in Westampton, the distance between Interstate 295 and the turnpike increases, and the turnpike reaches an exit for Burlington-Mount Holly Road (CR 541). Northeast of this point, the turnpike continues as a six-lane highway into Burlington Township, where it passes by houses and the Burlington Country Club before entering Springfield Township. Here, the turnpike passes by agricultural areas before crossing Assiscunk Creek.

=== Mansfield Township to Newark ===
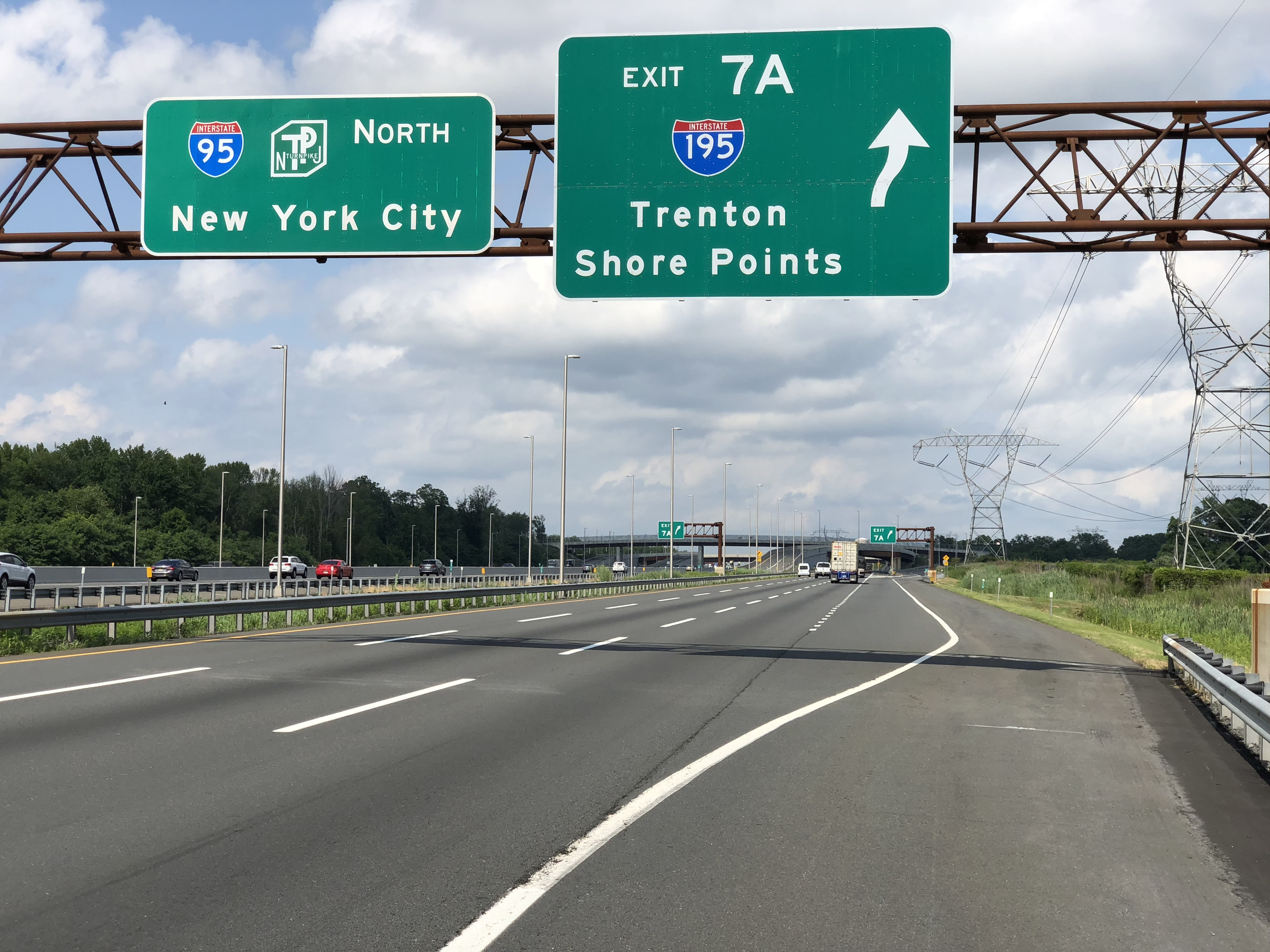
New Jersey Turnpike (I-95) northbound at the I-195 exit in Robbinsville Township

Now in Mansfield Township, the turnpike splits into a "dual-dual" configuration similar to a local-express configuration. The outer lanes are open to all vehicles and the inner lanes are limited to cars only, unless signed otherwise because of unusual conditions. The turnpike now has a total of 12 lanes, six in each direction (3-3-3-3). Just north of the split is an interchange with the Pearl Harbor Memorial Turnpike Extension, where the turnpike mainline runs concurrently with I-95. North of this point, the turnpike enters Bordentown Township and has an exit for US 206. Continuing northeast, the turnpike passes by a mix of residential neighborhoods and farmland and enters Chesterfield Township before passing over Crosswicks Creek and entering Hamilton Township in Mercer County. The highway then reaches the Richard Stockton and Woodrow Wilson service areas on the southbound and northbound sides, respectively. After the service areas, the turnpike enters Robbinsville Township and reaches an exit for I-195, an east–west freeway connecting the state capital of Trenton with the Jersey Shore. North of I-195, the turnpike passes to the west of several warehouses and traverses numerous parks and wooded areas. After crossing Assunpink Creek, the turnpike enters East Windsor Township, where the road changes its course to a slightly more northerly path. Near Hightstown is an exit for Route 133, which connects the turnpike with and provides a bypass for Route 33 in the area. North of here, the turnpike crosses the Millstone River into Cranbury, Middlesex County, and passes more warehouses on both sides of the road in addition to the southbound Molly Pitcher Service Area. After entering Monroe Township, the turnpike has a modified trumpet interchange with Route 32 serving Jamesburg. The interchange has a ramp for traffic seeking Route 32 eastbound forming an "S" shape, taking traffic to Cranbury South River Road. Upon crossing into South Brunswick, the turnpike crosses CSAO's Amboy Secondary and passes by more industrial parks. The highway then enters East Brunswick, where suburban development along the corridor greatly increases, indicating the entrance to the built-up portion of the New York metropolitan area. Continuing north, the turnpike passes to the east of a golf course and has the northbound Joyce Kilmer Service Area. The route briefly enters Milltown before crossing back into East Brunswick, where it passes by many homes before reaching an exit for Route 18 serving the county seat of New Brunswick. After Route 18, the turnpike enters New Brunswick and crosses over the Raritan River on the Basilone Memorial Bridge into Edison. The structure honors John Basilone, a Raritan resident who is the only United States Marine to be honored with the Medal of Honor, the Navy Cross and the Purple Heart. He died in the Battle of Iwo Jima in 1945.

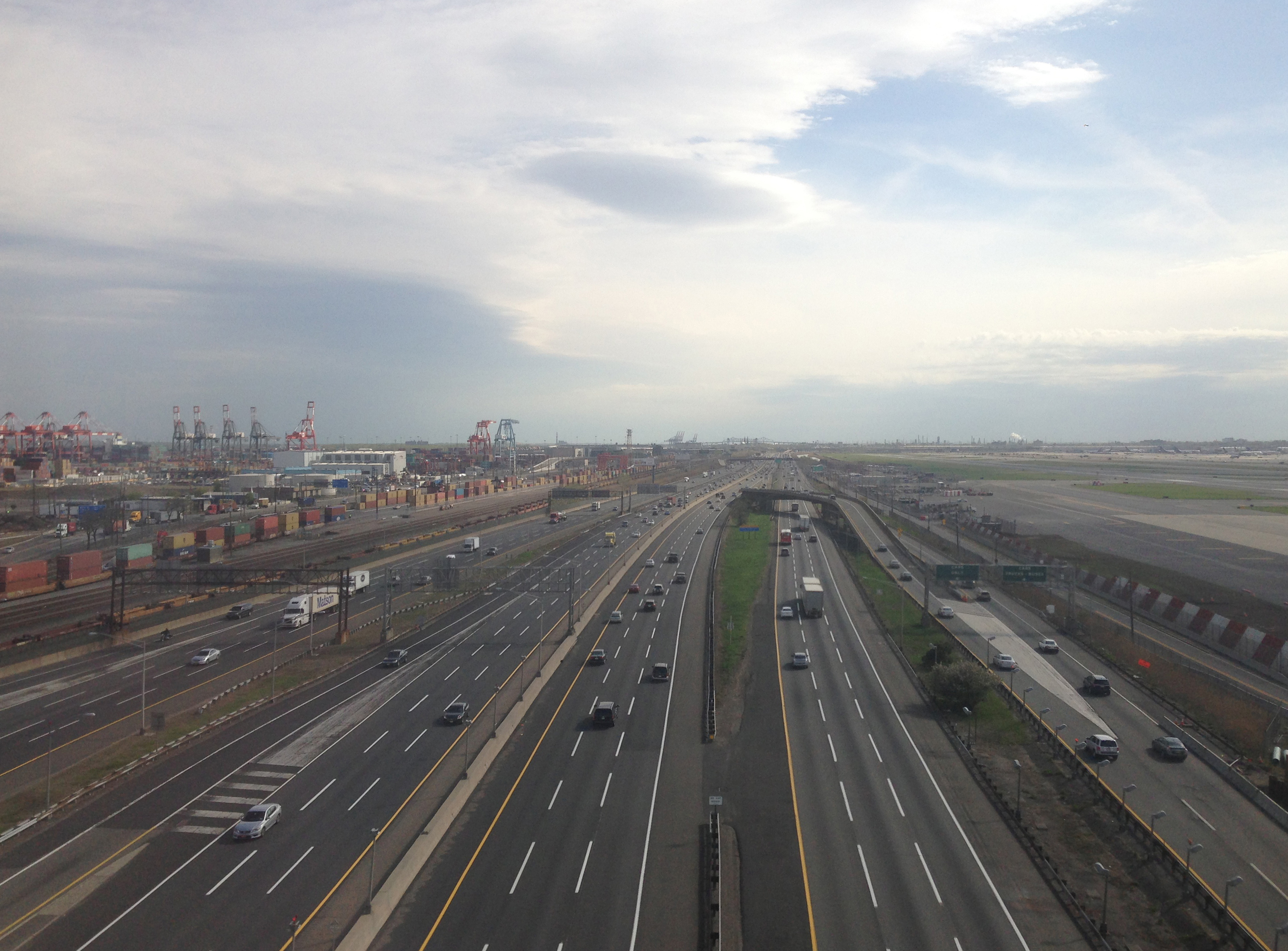
View south along the turnpike from a plane landing at Newark Liberty International Airport

After crossing the Raritan River, the turnpike passes by several warehouses and industrial parks before crossing CSAO's Bonhamtown Industrial Track line and reaching an exit serving I-287 and Route 440. Soon afterwards, the turnpike passes over the Middlesex Greenway and enters Woodbridge Township, where it reaches an exit serving the Garden State Parkway and US 9. North of this interchange is the headquarters of the NJTA. From Woodbridge Township to Newark, high-occupancy vehicle lanes (HOV lanes) exist on the outer roadway (truck lanes), thereby making it seven lanes in each direction (4-3-3-4). The HOV restrictions are in effect on weekdays, from 6:00 a.m. to 9:00 a.m. northbound, and 4:00 p.m. to 7:00 p.m. southbound (at times, the NJTA might suspend the HOV restrictions entirely during peak hours in case of unusual conditions). Continuing northeast, the turnpike passes under Amboy Avenue (Route 35) and crosses NJ Transit's North Jersey Coast Line. Past this point, the turnpike crosses the Woodbridge River and reaches the Grover Cleveland Service Area northbound and the Thomas Edison Service Area southbound. After passing over CSAO's Port Reading Secondary line, the turnpike enters Carteret and begins to run parallel to CSAO's Chemical Coast Secondary line, which is located east of the turnpike. In Carteret, the highway comes to an interchange with CR 602 serving both the borough and Rahway. Immediately north of the interchange, the Wallberg-Lovely Memorial Bridge carries the turnpike over the Rahway River. The bridge is dedicated to Private Martin Wallberg from Westfield, and Private Luke Lovely from, South Amboy, the first soldiers from New Jersey to die in World War I. In Linden, the turnpike passes to the east of Phillips 66's Bayway Refinery before reaching an exit for Interstate 278, which traverses the nearby Goethals Bridge. North of this point, the speed limit drops to 55 mph (89 km/h), and the turnpike crosses the Elizabeth River into Elizabeth. After bisecting residential areas, the route comes to an exit for the Route 81 freeway, providing access to Newark Liberty International Airport. While passing to the east of the airport and Brewster Road, the turnpike also passes to the west of the Elizabeth Center big-box center and the Port Newark–Elizabeth Marine Terminal upon entering Newark. A section of the turnpike and the surrounding land in Elizabeth and Newark has been called "the most dangerous two miles in America" by New Jersey Homeland Security officials due to the high volume of traffic and the density of potential terrorist targets in the surrounding area.

=== Newark to Ridgefield Park ===
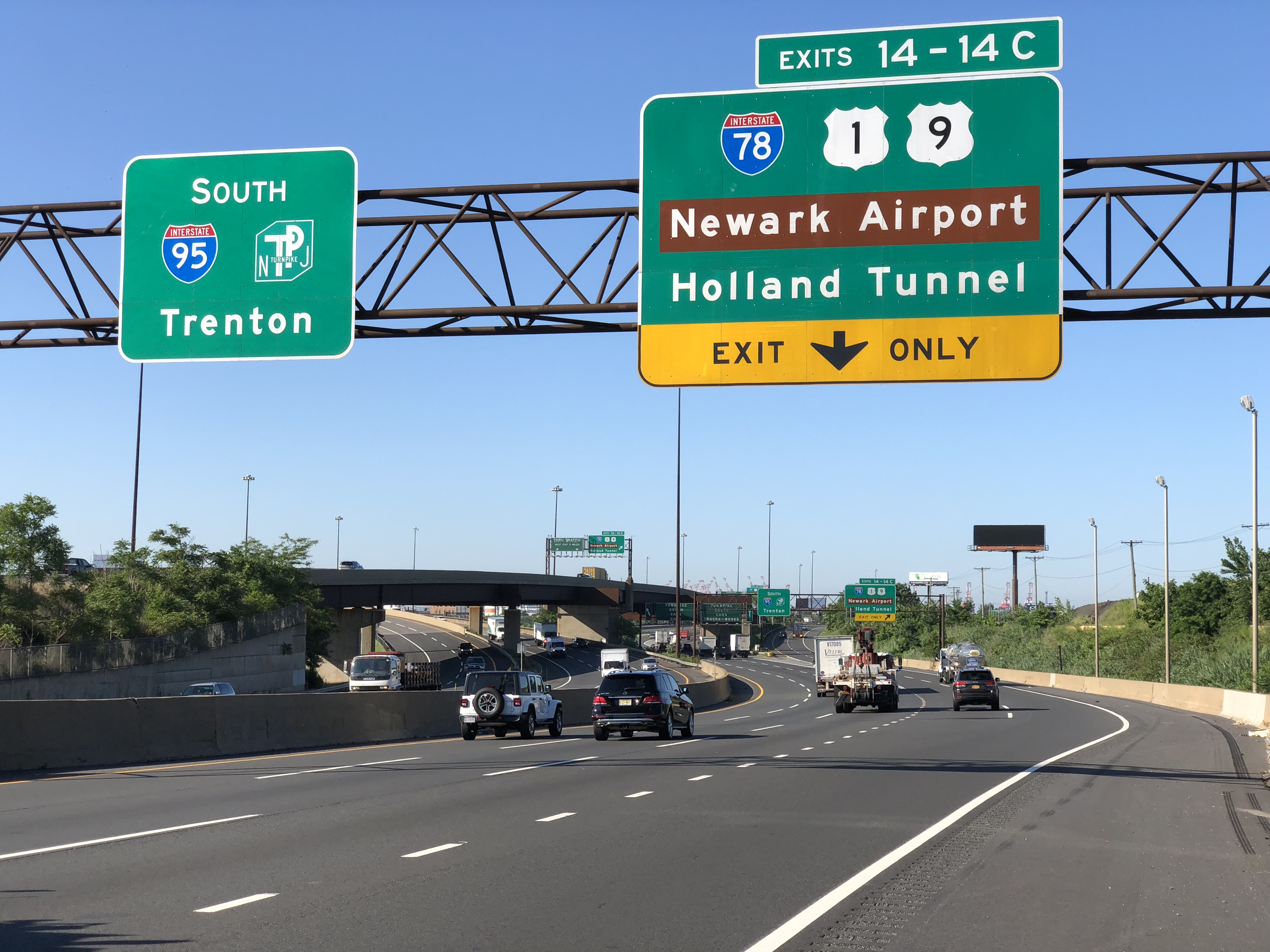
New Jersey Turnpike (I-95) southbound approaching the I-78/US 1–9 interchange in Newark

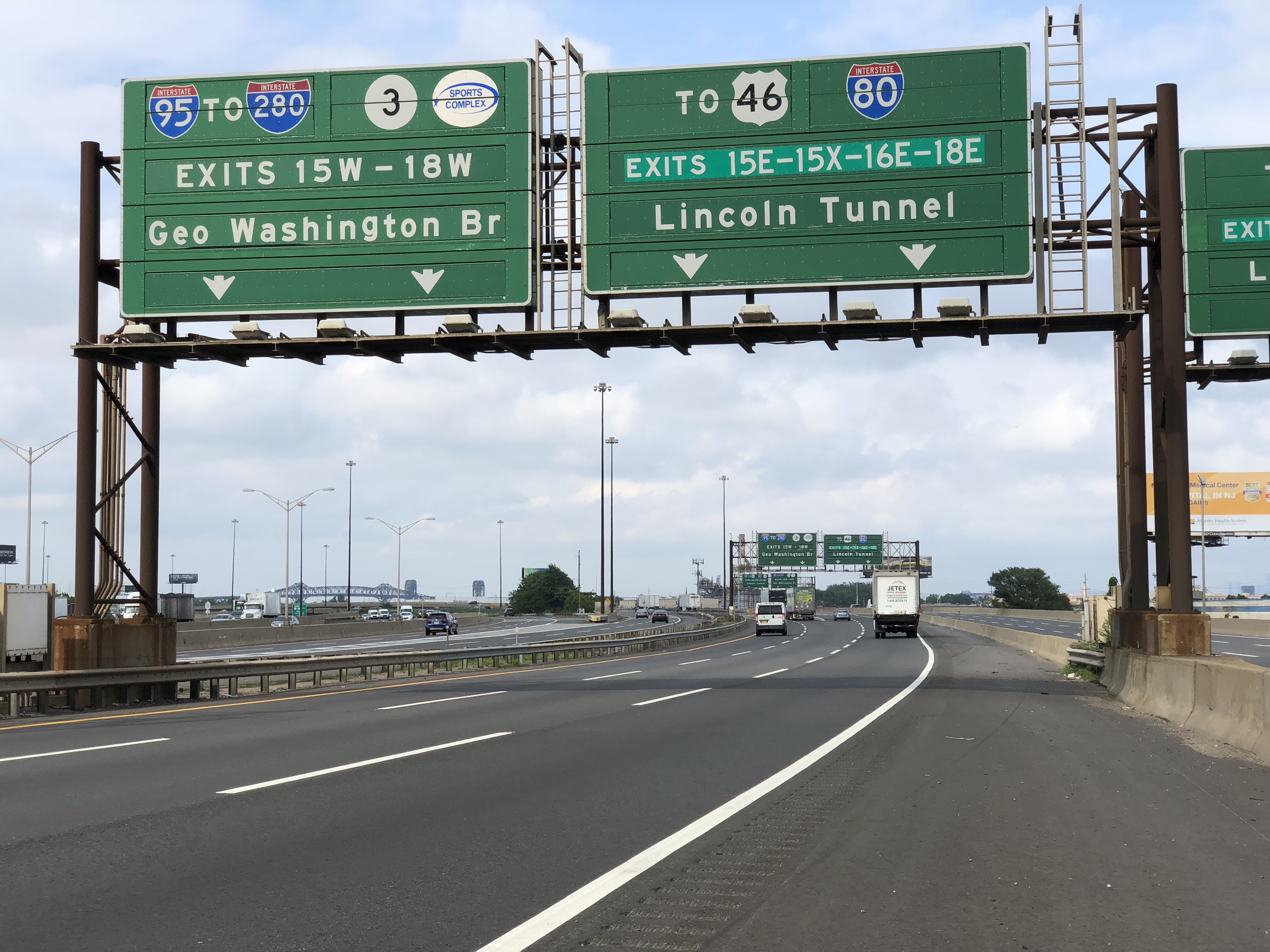
New Jersey Turnpike (I-95) northbound approaching split into Western Spur and Eastern Spur in Newark in 2020; these signs have since been removed and replaced with newer ones

After reaching the north end of the airport, the HOV lanes end, and the turnpike comes to an interchange with I-78, which is also the Newark Bay Extension of the turnpike east of the mainline. North of I-78, the turnpike passes over CSAO's Chemical Coast Secondary, Greenville Running Track, and National Docks Branch at the Oak Island Yard. At this point, the car-truck lane configuration ends, and the turnpike splits into two spurs: the Eastern Spur (the original roadway) and the Western Spur (opened in 1970). Both are signed as I-95. The Western Spur is posted for through traffic on I-95 seeking I-280 and the George Washington Bridge, while traffic seeking US 46, I-80, and the Lincoln Tunnel is routed via the Eastern Spur. NJDOT, which calls every class of highway "Route", calls the Western Spur "Route 95W". The NJTA refers to the complex series of roadways and ramps linking the car–truck lanes, the two spurs, as well as traffic heading to and from I-78 as the "Southern Mixing Bowl". Both spurs have an exit for US 1-9 Truck and pass under the Pulaski Skyway (US 1-9) at this point before crossing over CSAO's Passaic and Harsimus Line, and will meet up at US 46 and I-80 to continue to the George Washington Bridge where the Turnpike will eventually end.

==== Eastern Spur ====
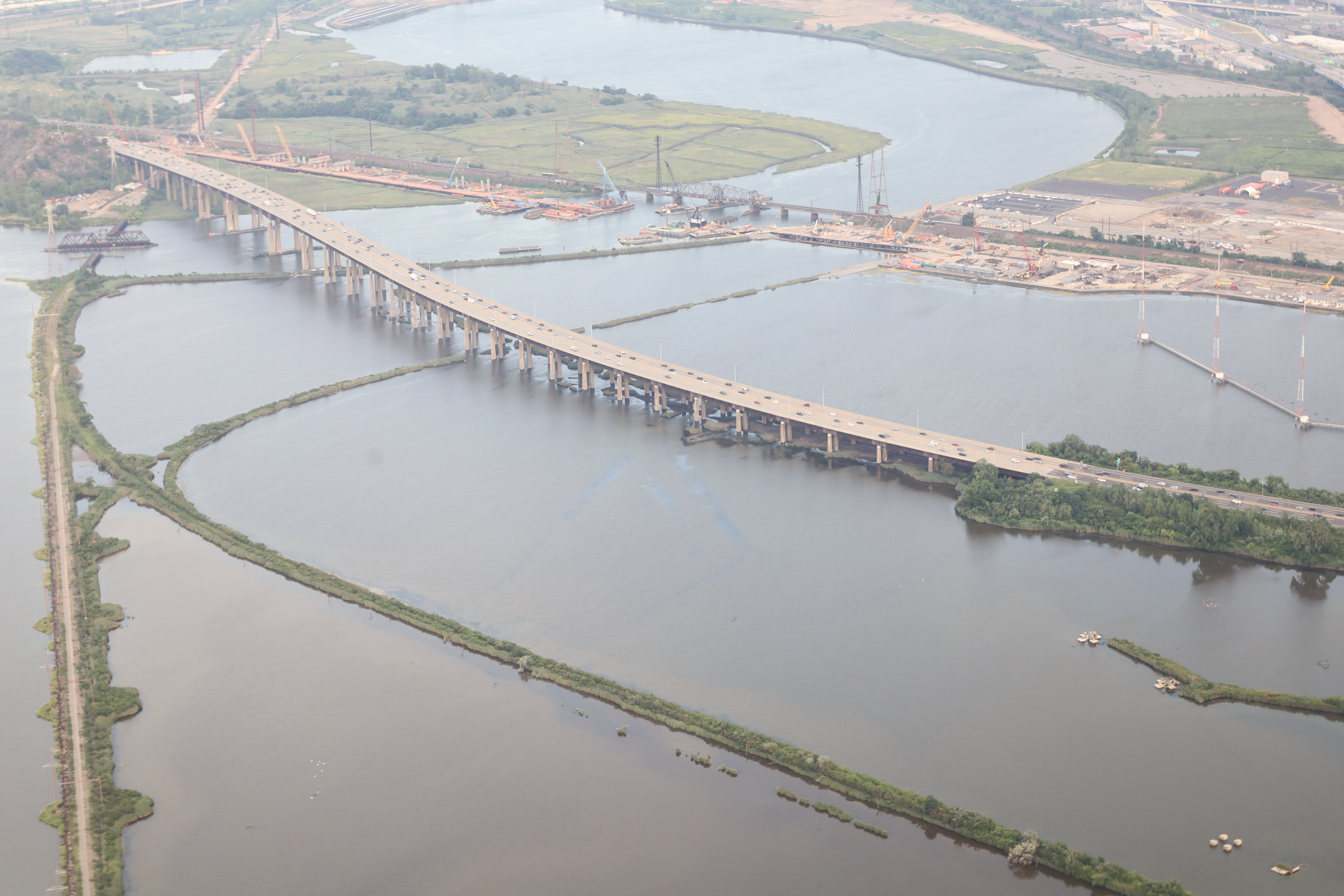
Aerial view of the Lewandowski Bridge over the Passaic River in 2023, flanked by the DB Draw (left), the under-construction Portal North Bridge, and the Portal Bridge (right)

The Eastern Spur crosses the Passaic River on the Chaplain Washington Bridge, which honors Rev. John P. Washington who gave up his life jacket and died as the SS Dorchester sank on February 3, 1943. After crossing over tracks carrying PATH's Newark–World Trade Center line, NJ Transit's Morris & Essex Lines, and Amtrak's Northeast Corridor, the spur surfaces into Kearny, Hudson County, as a six-lane highway, and has a partial interchange with I-280, containing only a southbound exit and northbound entrance.

Past this point, the spur passes over Route 7 and crosses the Hackensack River on the Lewandowski Hackensack River Bridge. The bridge was named in honor of the three Lewandowski brothers, Army Private Alexander, Marine Sergeant Walter and Air Force Lieutenant William, who were killed in action during World War II within 18 months of each other.

The turnpike then enters Secaucus and crosses the railroad right-of-way of the future Essex-Hudson Greenway and runs along the east side of Snake Hill. It then passes over NJ Transit's Main Line at Secaucus Junction station, which serves NJ Transit trains running along the Northeast Corridor and the Main Line. After the southbound lanes have the Alexander Hamilton Service Area, the turnpike reaches the exit 18E toll plaza, serving as the northern end of the ticket system. Immediately afterwards is an interchange with Route 495 and Route 3, providing access to the Lincoln Tunnel.

After passing through swampland in the Meadowlands, the spur crosses into Ridgefield, Bergen County. Here, the Eastern Spur comes to the northernmost service area on the turnpike, the Vince Lombardi Service Area. After passing over the New York, Susquehanna and Western Railway's New Jersey Subdivision line and CSX's River Subdivision line, the highway merges back together with the Western Spur as it passes east of PSE&G's Bergen Generating Station and crosses Overpeck Creek into Ridgefield Park, where the turnpike comes to its original northern terminus at U.S. Route 46.

==== Western Spur ====
The Harry Laderman Bridge, named after the first turnpike employee killed on the job, carries the Western Spur over the Passaic River and then tracks carrying PATH's Newark–World Trade Center line, NJ Transit's Morris & Essex Lines, and Amtrak's Northeast Corridor. Running north with six lanes, the Western Spur has a full interchange with I-280 before crossing over Route 7 and the former Boonton Line. The spur then enters Lyndhurst and crosses NJ Transit's Main Line and Berrys Creek before passing over NJ Transit's Bergen County Line and entering East Rutherford. Here, the Western Spur has a junction with Route 3, where it loses a lane in each direction. The highway reaches the exit 18W toll plaza before passing by the Meadowlands Sports Complex and the American Dream shopping and entertainment complex, which are served by an E-ZPass-only southbound exit and northbound entrance with connections to Route 120 and CR 503 via Route 3. After crossing the Hackensack River, the Western Spur has access to the Vince Lombardi Service Area before crossing the New York, Susquehanna and Western Railway's New Jersey Subdivision line and CSX's River Subdivision line and merging with the Eastern Spur.

=== Extensions ===
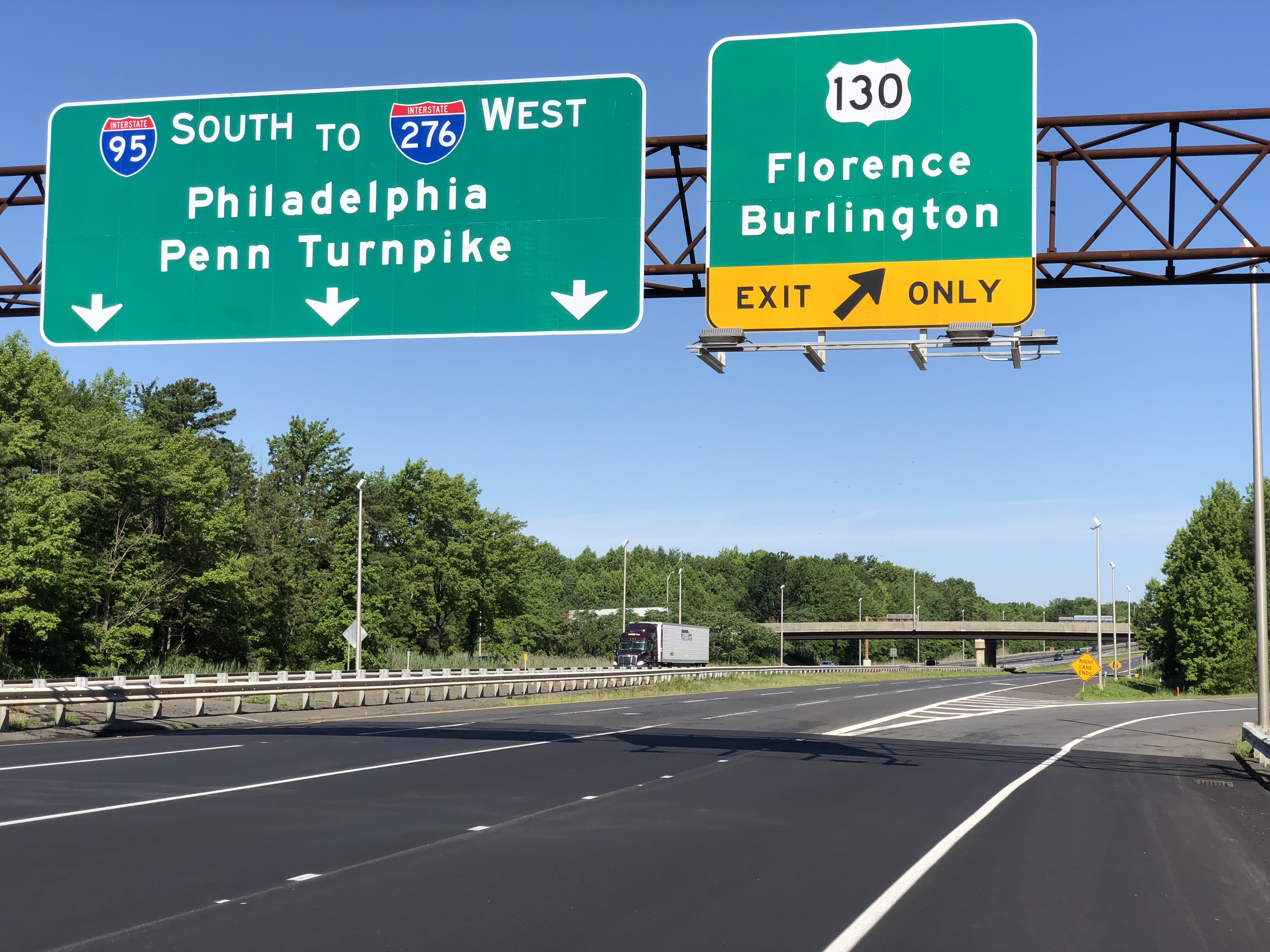
View south along the Pearl Harbor Memorial Turnpike Extension (I-95) at US 130 in Florence

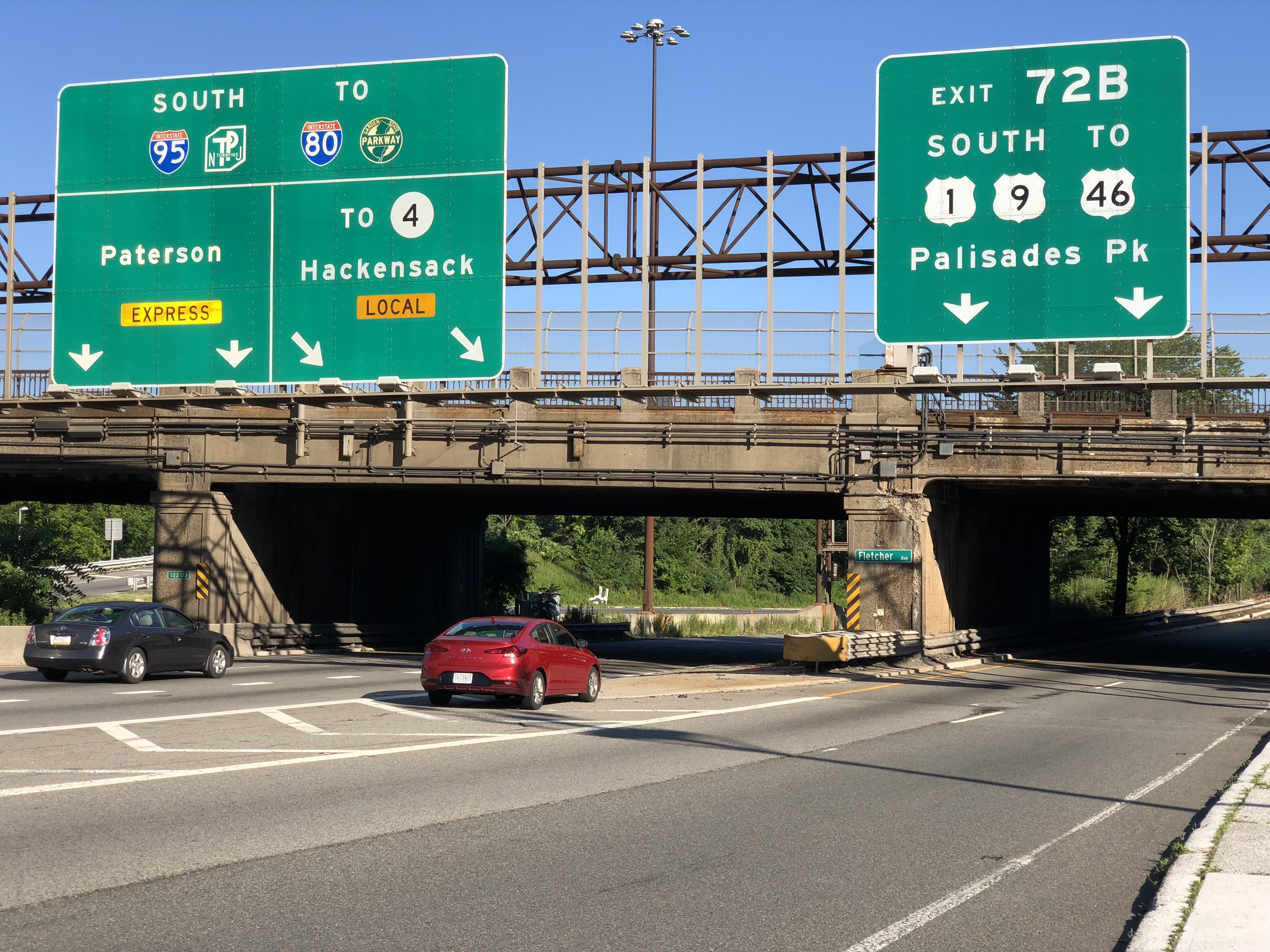
I-95 southbound at the north end of NJTA jurisdiction in Fort Lee

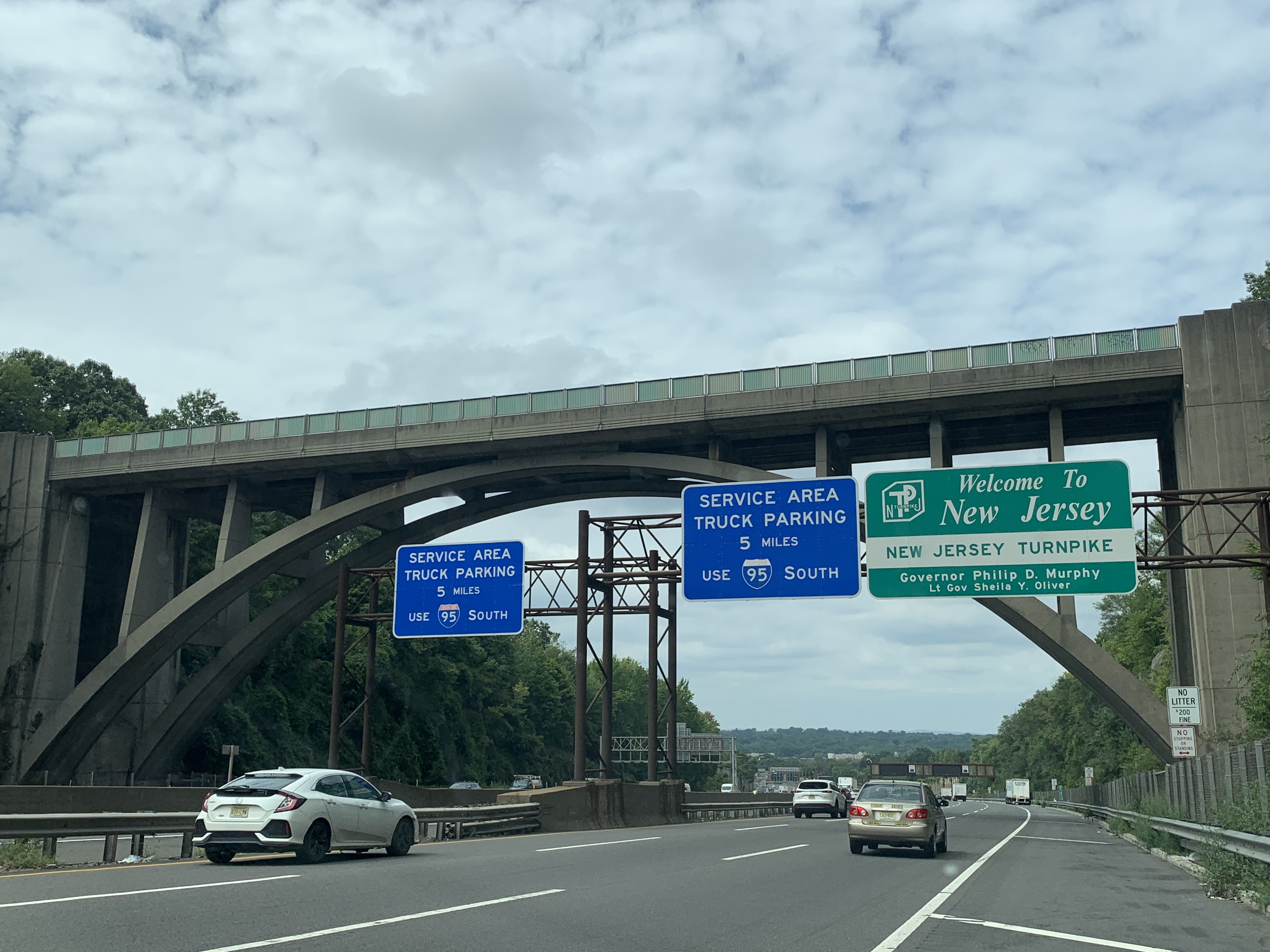
Sign welcoming drivers to the New Jersey Turnpike under the Edgewood Road Bridge

The turnpike has three extensions; the first, the 8.2-mile-long (13.2 km) Newark Bay Extension, opened in 1956, and is part of I-78. It connects Newark with Lower Manhattan via the Holland Tunnel in Jersey City and intersects the mainline near Newark Liberty International Airport. This extension has three exits (exits 14A, 14B, and 14C), and due to its design (four lanes with a shoulderless Jersey barrier divider), has a 50-mile-per-hour (80 km/h) speed limit. The extension traverses the Newark Bay Bridge (officially the Vincent R. Casciano Memorial Bridge), which is a steel cantilever bridge spanning Newark Bay and connecting Newark and Bayonne. Dubbed the "world's most expensive road" by The Jersey Journal, it was completed April 4, 1956. Casciano was a state assemblyman and a lifetime resident of Bayonne.

The second extension, known as the Pearl Harbor Memorial Turnpike Extension (or Pennsylvania Turnpike Connector), carries I-95 off the mainline of the New Jersey Turnpike at exit 6 and connects to the Pennsylvania Turnpike via the Delaware River–Turnpike Toll Bridge, a continuous truss bridge spanning the Delaware River. This extension, and the Delaware River Bridge, were opened to traffic on May 25, 1956. A six-mile-long (9.7 km), six-lane highway, it has an exit, designated as 6A, to US 130 near Florence. The extension was formerly designated as Route 700P, but was officially designated as I-95 after the Somerset Freeway was cancelled, and was signed as such when the first components of the Pennsylvania Turnpike/Interstate 95 Interchange Project were completed on September 22, 2018.

The third extension, the four-mile (6.4 km) stretch of I-95 north of US 46 came under NJTA jurisdiction in 1992, as NJDOT sold the road to balance the state budget, and it is not tolled. This section of the road—known as the I-95 Extension—extends the mainline to travel past the interchange for I-80 in Teaneck where the original terminus was, and through a cut in the Hudson Palisades to the George Washington Bridge Plaza in Fort Lee. The NJDOT originally built a "missing link" in between US 46 and I-80, then a connector highway from I-80 to the George Washington Bridge, prior to being sold to the NJTA. Even though it was not constructed when the turnpike first opened, the I-95 Extension is still considered to be a part of the mainline, not just a spur like the Newark Bay or Pennsylvania Turnpike extensions are, despite it not being tolled. It also passes under the Edgewood Road Bridge in Leonia, a high overpass known for its scenery for long-distance travelers entering New Jersey. The turnpike terminates at US 9W (exit 72), with the final approaches to the George Washington Bridge along I-95 maintained by the Port Authority of New York and New Jersey. Signs saying "Turnpike Entrance" southbound past I-80 mean entering the tolled parts of the turnpike. Exit numbers along this section follow the mile markers I-95 would have had if the Somerset Freeway was built.

== Services ==
=== Service areas ===
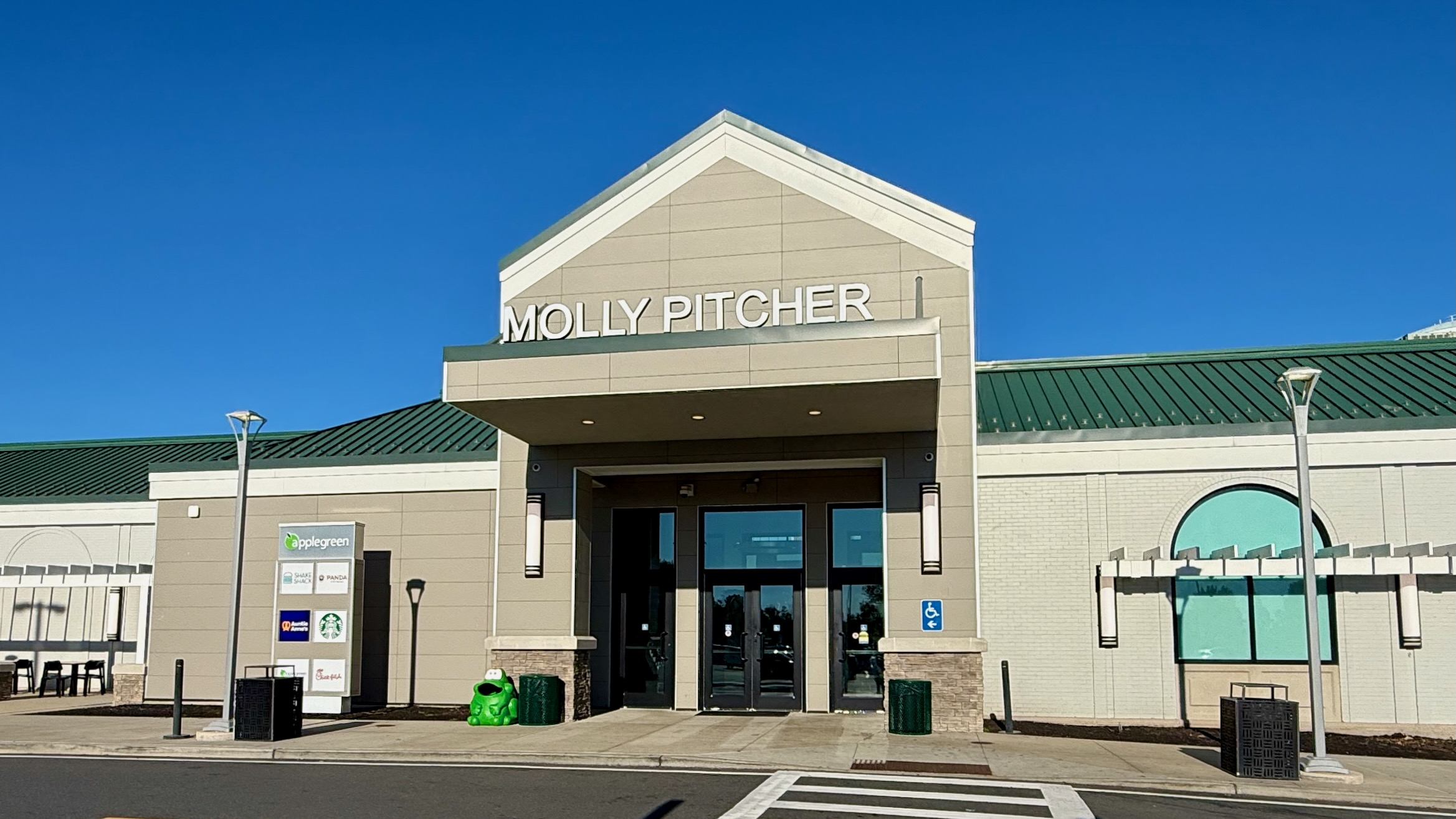
Molly Pitcher Service Area

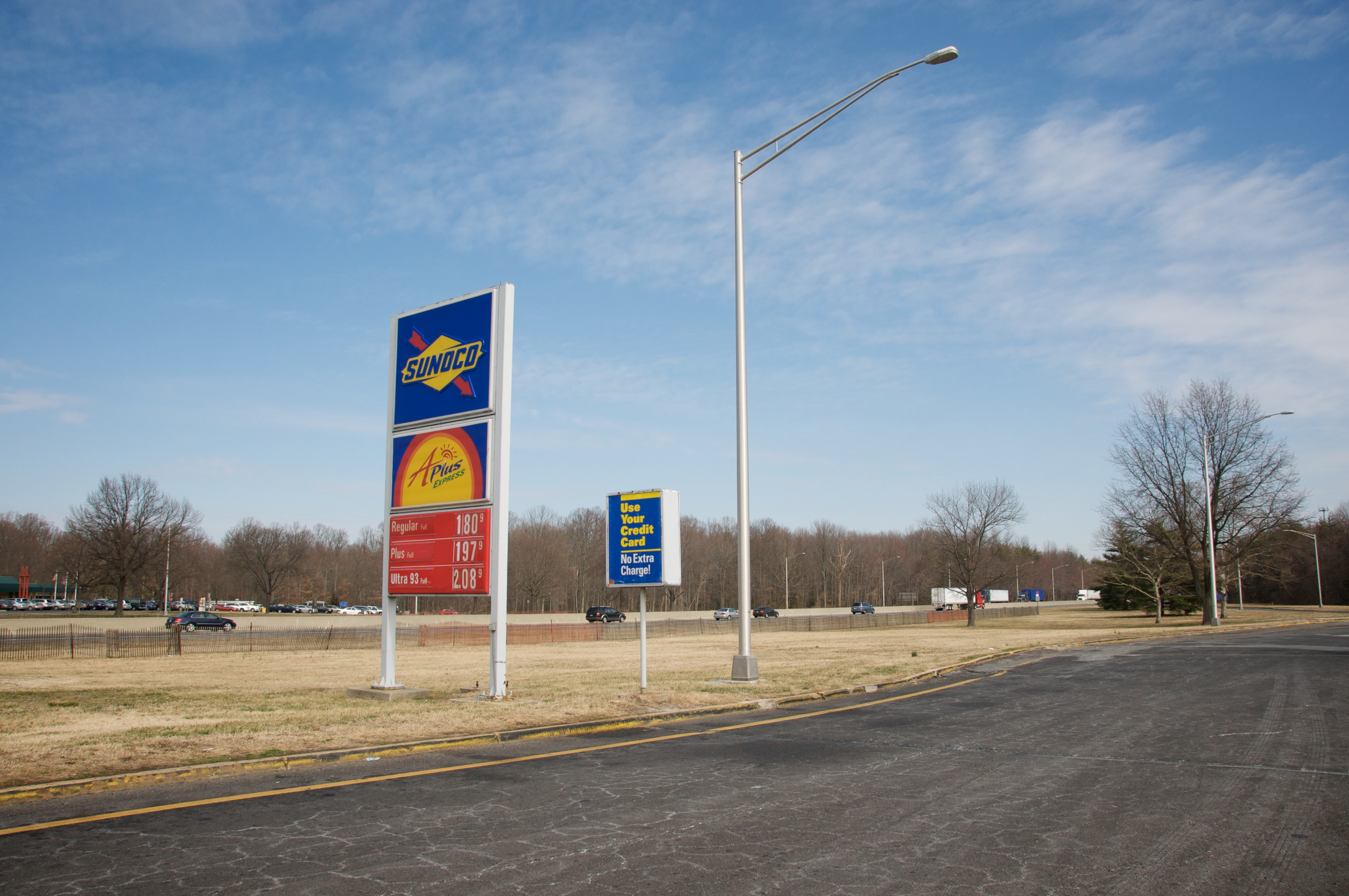
John Fenwick Service Area

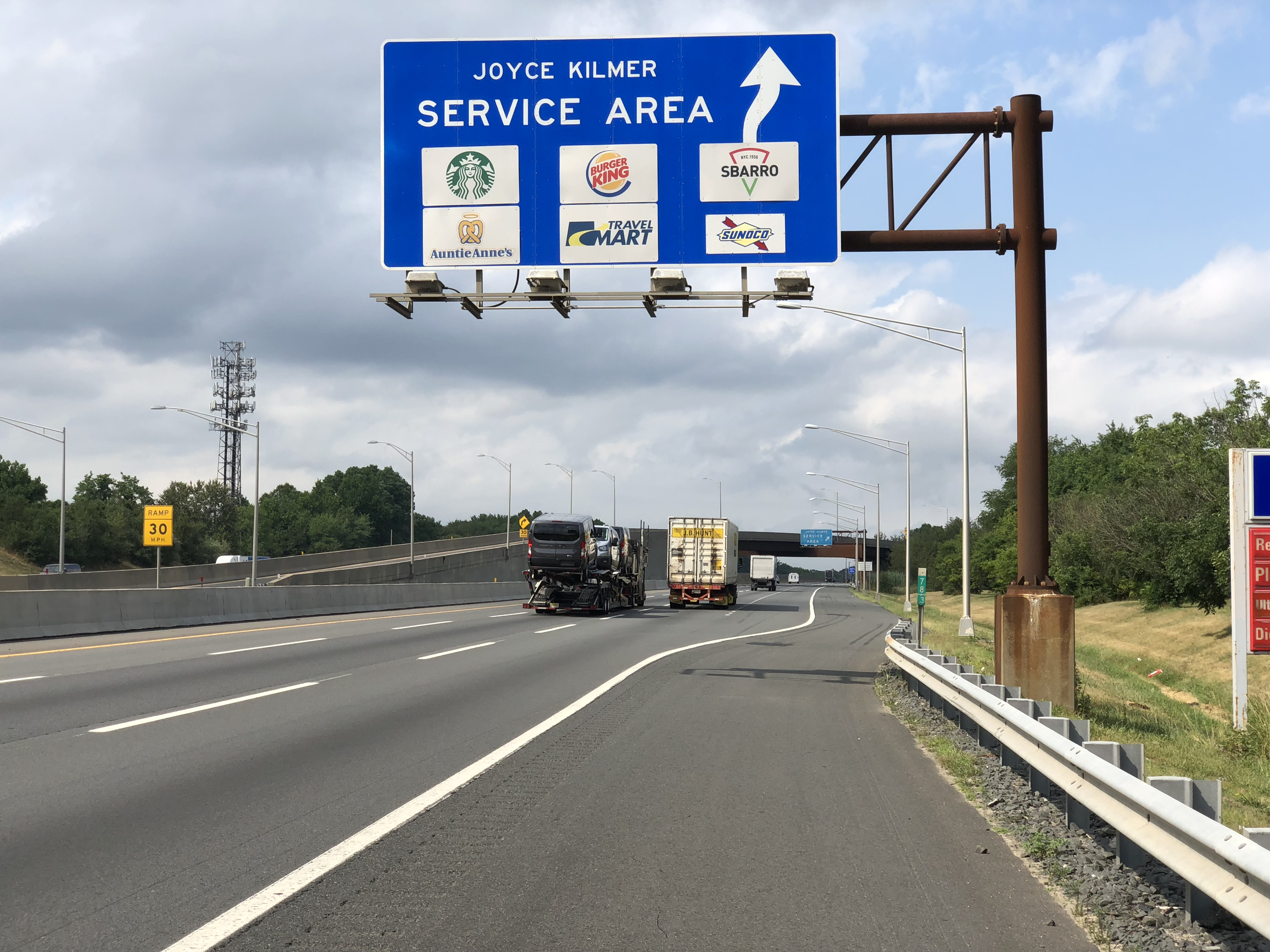
Signage for the Joyce Kilmer Service Area

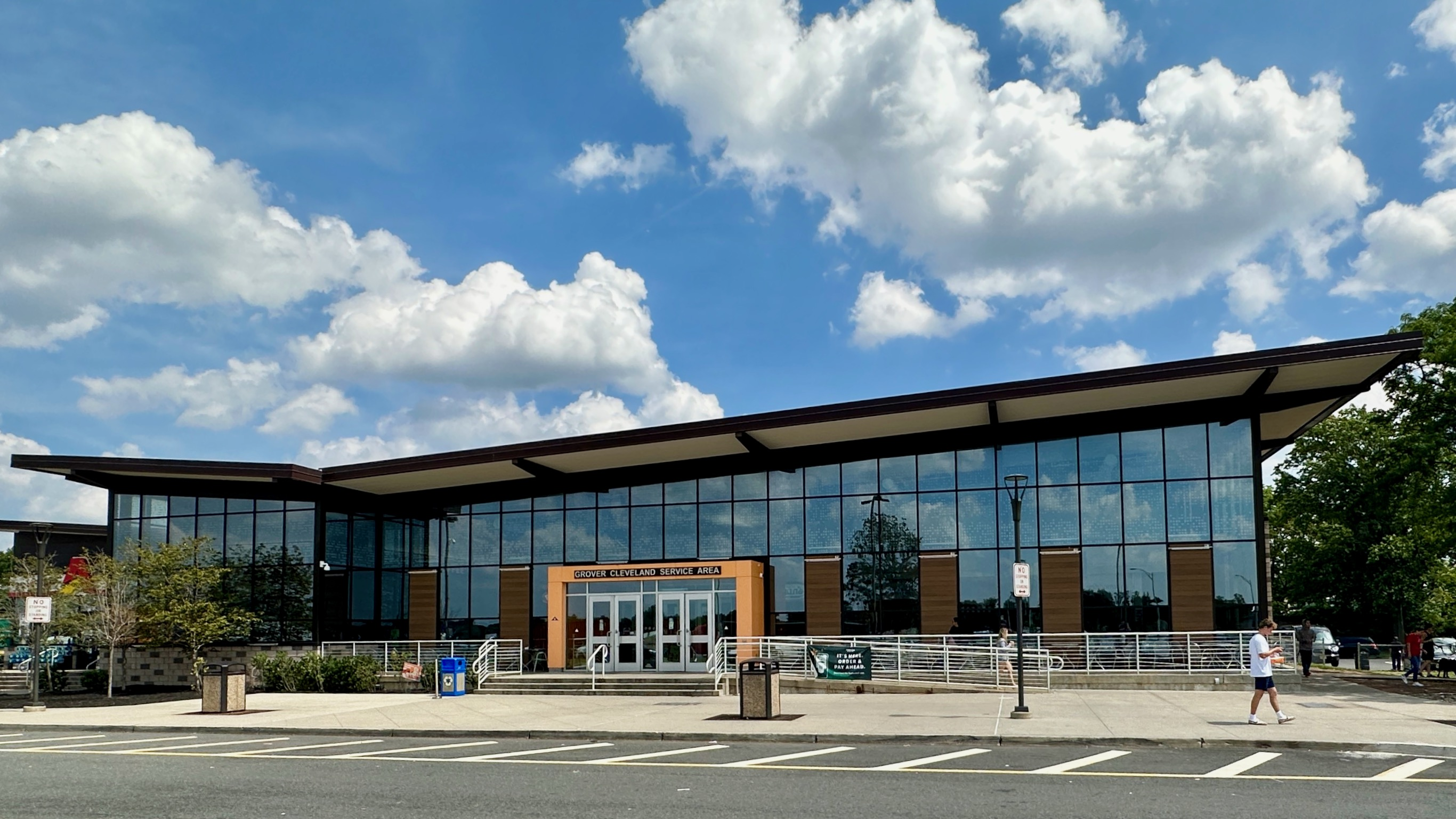
Grover Cleveland Service Area

Along with the Garden State Parkway, the New Jersey Turnpike is noted for naming its service areas after notable New Jersey residents.

Service areas, south to north
Service area	Direction	mi	km	Nearest exits	Location	Notes
Clara Barton	Southbound	5.4	8.7	1, 2	Oldmans Township	
John Fenwick	Northbound	5.4	8.7	1, 2	Oldmans Township	
Walt Whitman	Southbound	30.2	48.6	3, 4	Cherry Hill	
James Fenimore Cooper	Northbound	39.4	63.4	4, 5	Mount Laurel	
Richard Stockton	Southbound	58.7	94.5	7, 7A	Hamilton Township	
Woodrow Wilson	Northbound	58.7	94.5	7, 7A	Hamilton Township	
Molly Pitcher	Southbound	71.7	115.4	8, 8A	Cranbury	
Joyce Kilmer	Northbound	78.7	126.7	8A, 9	East Brunswick	
Grover Cleveland	Northbound	92.9	149.5	11, 12	Woodbridge Township	Damaged by Hurricane Sandy in 2012; reopened in 2015
Thomas Edison	Southbound	92.9	149.5	11, 12	Woodbridge Township	
Alexander Hamilton	Southbound	111.6	179.6	15X, 16E	Secaucus	Eastern spur only
Vince Lombardi	Both	116.0	186.7	17/19W, 68	Ridgefield	Eastern and western spurs; Vince Lombardi Park & Ride located at service area

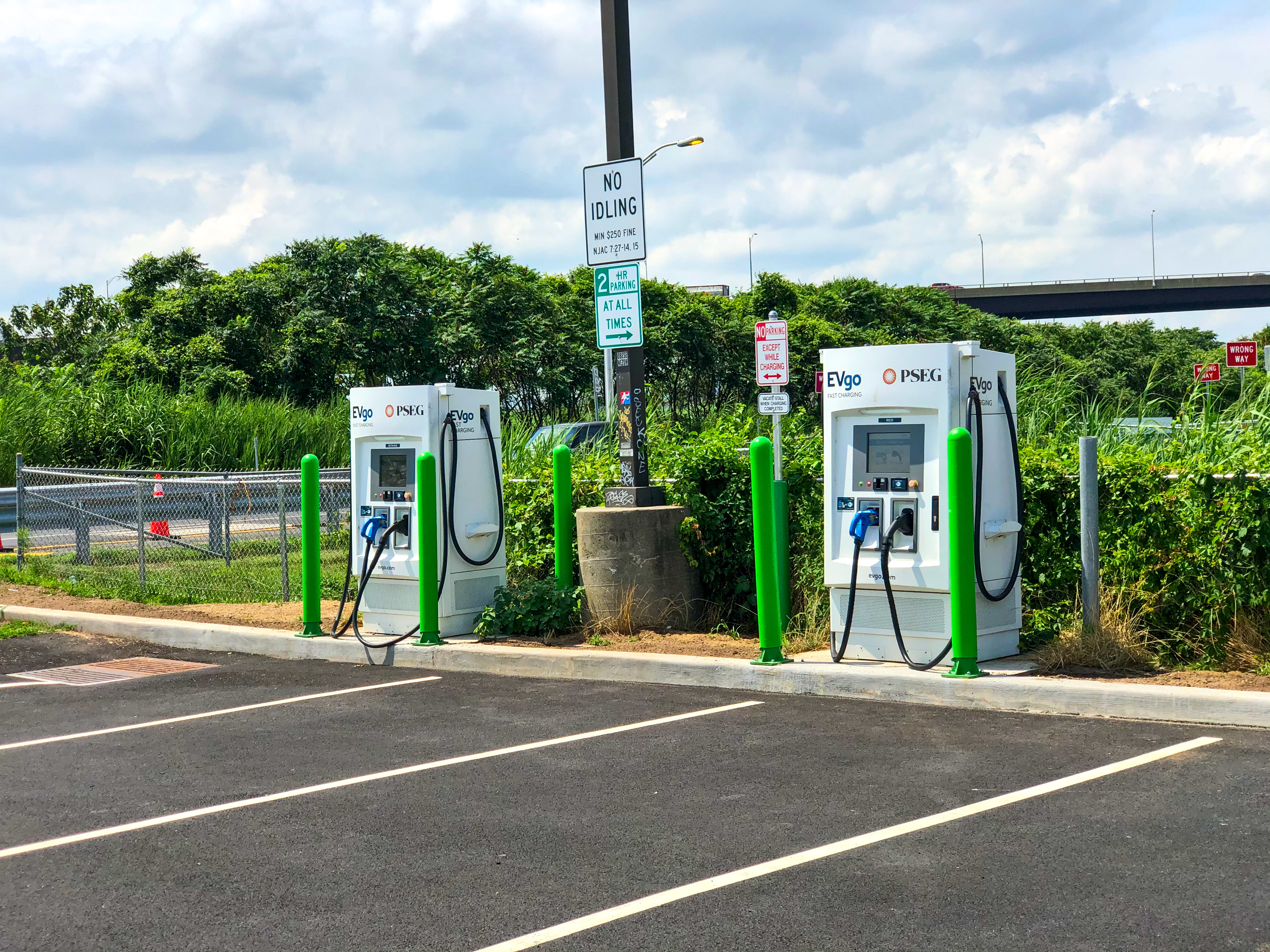
Electric vehicle charging machines at Vince Lombardi Service Area

Turnpike service areas consist mostly of fast-food restaurants operated by Iris Buyer LLC (Applegreen). Each rest area also includes restrooms, water fountains, a Sunoco gas station with a small convenience store, with gas price signs posted about half a mile (0.8 km) before reaching the rest area, and a separate parking area for cars and trucks. Some have a dedicated bus parking area, Wi-Fi, and a gift shop as well.

Before 1982, there was a service area on the northbound side named for Admiral William Halsey. However, in 1982, exit 13A was created, which caused the obscuring of the rest area, as they both overlapped with each other. Anyone who wanted to get to the service area missed exiting at exit 13A, and (northbound) drivers who took that exit missed that service area. The service area closed permanently on June 4, 1994. Today, it can be seen by motorists when exiting 13A from the northbound car lanes, where a temporary concrete barrier obstructs an open asphalt lot.

Two service areas were located on the Newark Bay Extension (one eastbound and one westbound) located west of exit 14B. These were closed in the early 1970s. The eastbound service area was named for John Stevens, the westbound service area for Peter Stuyvesant.

In late March 2010, it was revealed that the state transportation commissioner was considering selling the naming rights of the rest areas to help address a budget shortfall.

The Grover Cleveland Service Area in Woodbridge Township was temporarily closed because of storm damage from Hurricane Sandy in October 2012, with only fuel available. It was rebuilt and fully reopened on November 23, 2015. In 2015, the NJTA installed Tesla Supercharger stations in the Molly Pitcher and Joyce Kilmer service areas to allow Tesla car owners to charge their vehicles. A proposal to offer charging stations for non-Tesla vehicles is also under consideration.

=== Emergency assistance ===
The NJTA offers 12-foot-wide (3.7 m) shoulders wherever possible, and disabled vehicle service may be obtained by dialing #95 on a cellular phone. Towing and roadside assistance are provided from authorized garages. The New Jersey State Police is the primary police agency that handles calls for service on the turnpike. New Jersey State Police Troop D serves the New Jersey Turnpike, with stations in Cranbury, Moorestown, and Newark. Other emergency services such as fire and first aid are usually handled by the jurisdictions in which that section of the turnpike passes.

== History ==
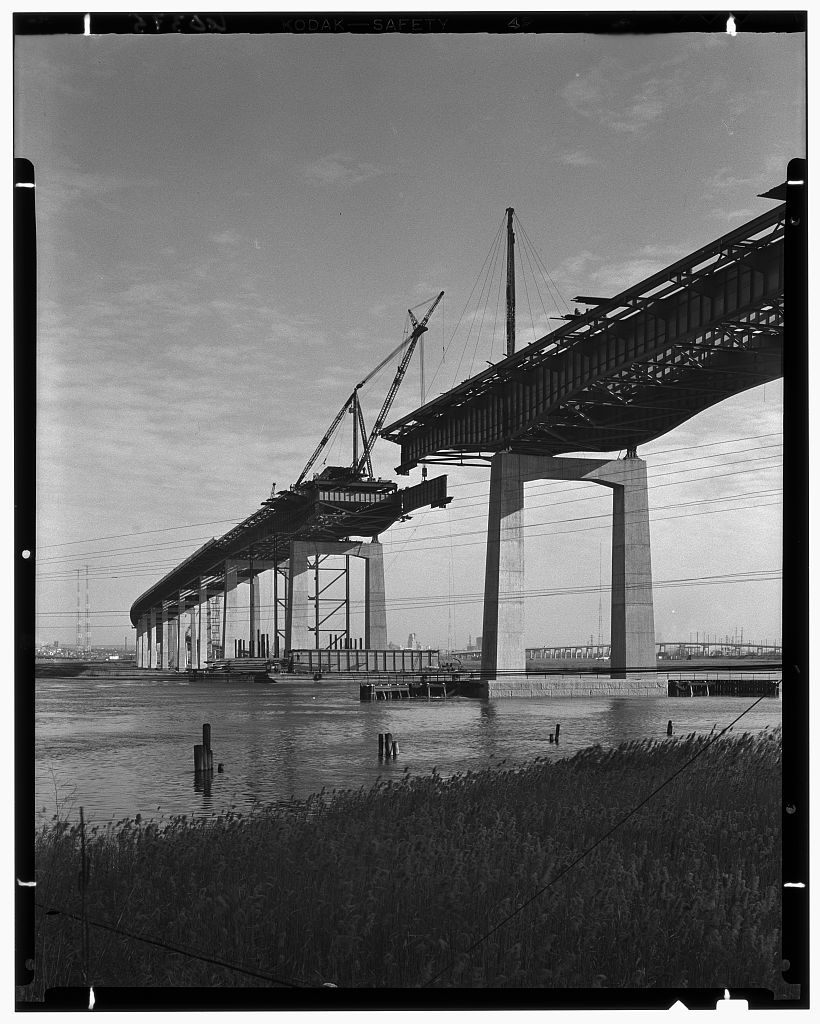
Hackensack Run bridge under construction in 1951

=== Precursors and planning ===
Route 100
- Location: New Brunswick–Fort Lee
- Existed: 1938–1953

Route 300
- Location: Deepwater–New Brunswick
- Existed: 1938–1953

Route 100 and Route 300 were two state highways proposed in the 1930s by the New Jersey State Highway Department as precursors to the New Jersey Turnpike.

The road that is now the New Jersey Turnpike was first planned by the State Highway Department as two freeways in 1938. Route 100 was the route from New Brunswick to the George Washington Bridge, plus a spur to the Holland Tunnel, now the Newark Bay Extension of the Turnpike. Route 300 was the southern part of the turnpike from the Delaware Memorial Bridge to New Brunswick. However, the State Highway Department did not have the funds to complete the two freeways, and very little of the road was built under its auspices. Instead, in 1948, the NJTA was created to build the road, and the two freeways were built as a single toll road.

Route S100 was a proposed spur of Route 100 in Elizabeth. It was never built, although Route 81 follows a similar alignment.

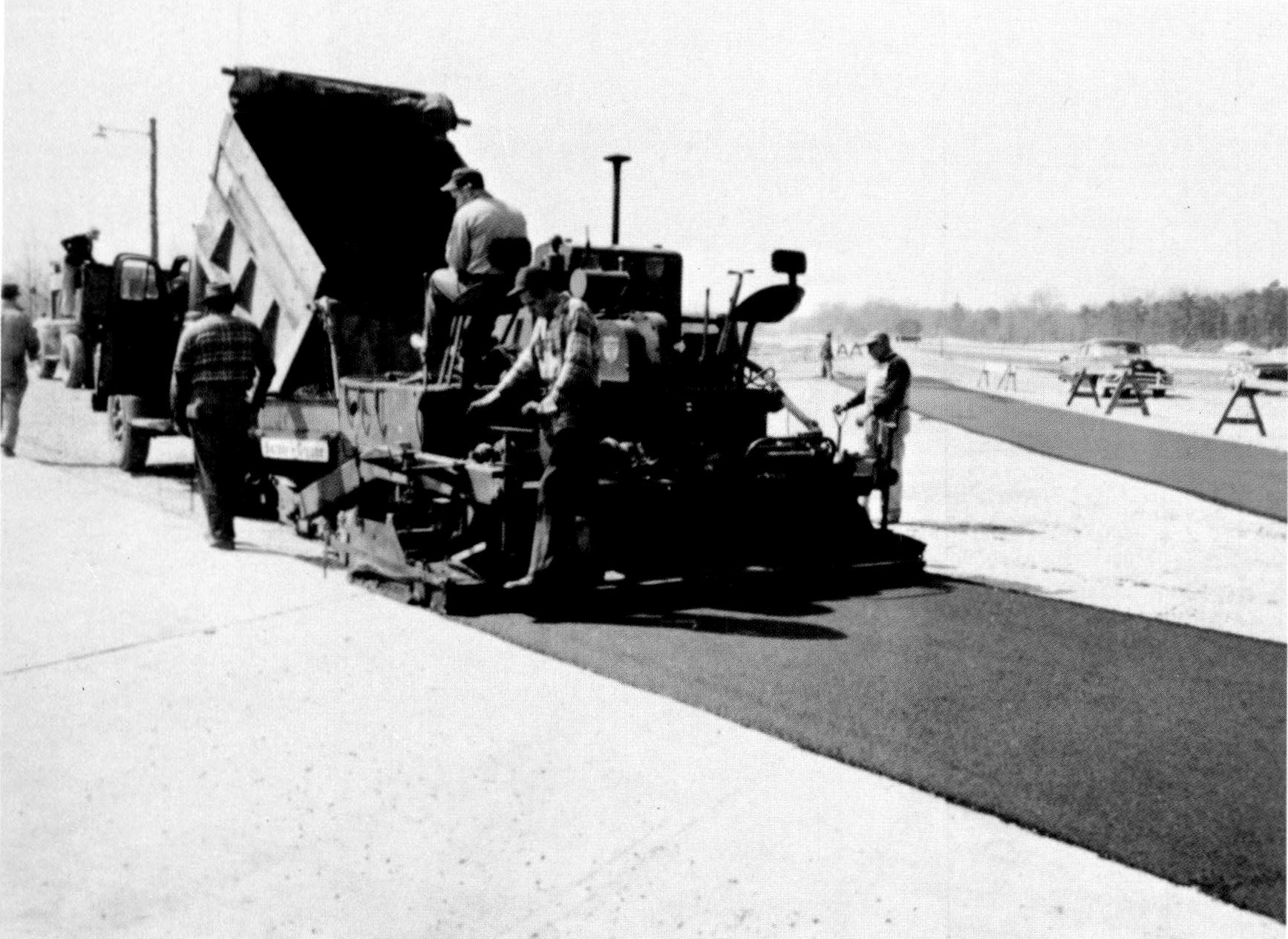
Construction of the New Jersey Turnpike

According to a letter to the editor written by Kathleen Troast Pitney, the daughter of Paul L. Troast, the first chairman of the NJTA:

Governor Driscoll appointed three men to the turnpike authority in the late 1940s—Maxwell Lester, George Smith and Paul Troast, my father, as chairman. They had no enabling legislation and no funding. They were able to open more than two-thirds of the road in 11 months, completing the whole (project) in less than two years ... When the commissioners broached the subject of landscaping the road ... the governor told them he wanted a road to take the interstate traffic ... off New Jersey's existing roads. Since 85 percent of the traffic at that time was estimated to be from out of state, why spend additional funds on landscaping?

A brochure Interesting Facts about the New Jersey Turnpike, dating from soon after the road's opening, says that when the turnpike's bonds are paid off, "the law provides that the turnpike be turned over to the state for inclusion in the public highway system". Due to new construction, and the expectation that the turnpike pays for policing and maintenance, this has never come to pass.

=== Construction ===
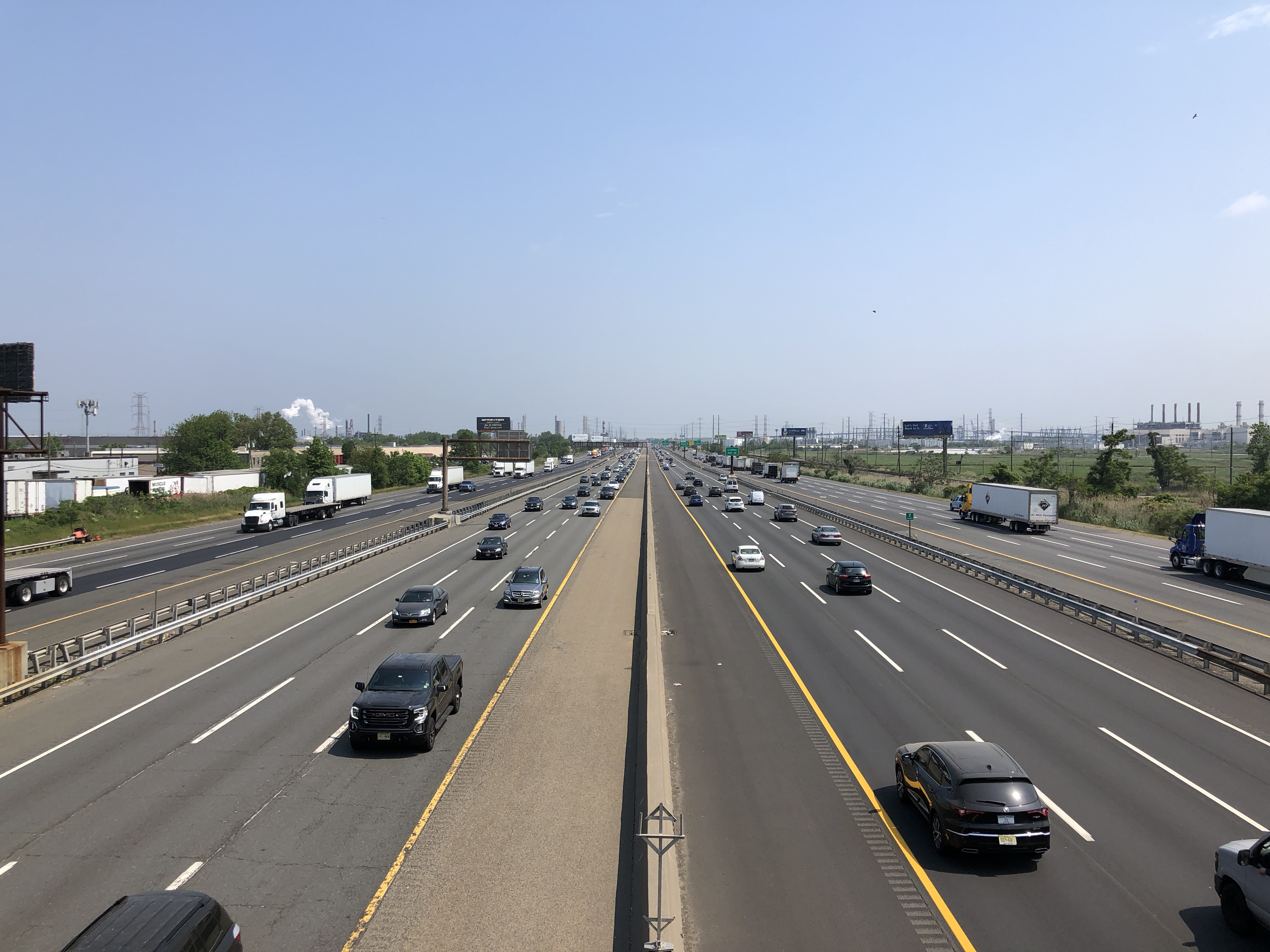
New Jersey Turnpike (I-95) northbound in Linden

The project of building the turnpike had its challenges. One major problem was the construction in Elizabeth, where either 450 homes or 32 businesses would be destroyed, depending on the chosen route. The engineers decided to go through the residential area, since they considered it the grittiest and the closest route to both Newark Airport and the Port Newark–Elizabeth Marine Terminal seaport.

When construction finally got to Newark, there was the new challenge of deciding to build either over or under the Pulaski Skyway. If construction went above the skyway, the costs would be much higher. If they went under, the costs would be lower, but the roadway would be very close to the Passaic River, making it harder for ships to pass through. The turnpike was ultimately built to pass under. As part of a 2005 seismic retrofit project, the NJTA lowered its roadway to increase vertical clearance and allow for full-width shoulders, which had been constrained by the location of the skyway supports. Engineers replaced the bearings and lowered the bridge by four feet (1.2 m), without shutting down traffic. The work was carried out by Koch Skanska in 2004, under a $35 million contract (equivalent to $55.5 million in 2024). The project's engineers were from a joint venture of Dewberry Goodkind Inc. and HNTB Corp. Temporary towers supported the bridge while bearings were removed from the 150 piers and the concrete replaced on the pier tops. The lowering process for an 800-foot (240 m) section of the bridge was done over 56 increments, during five weeks of work.

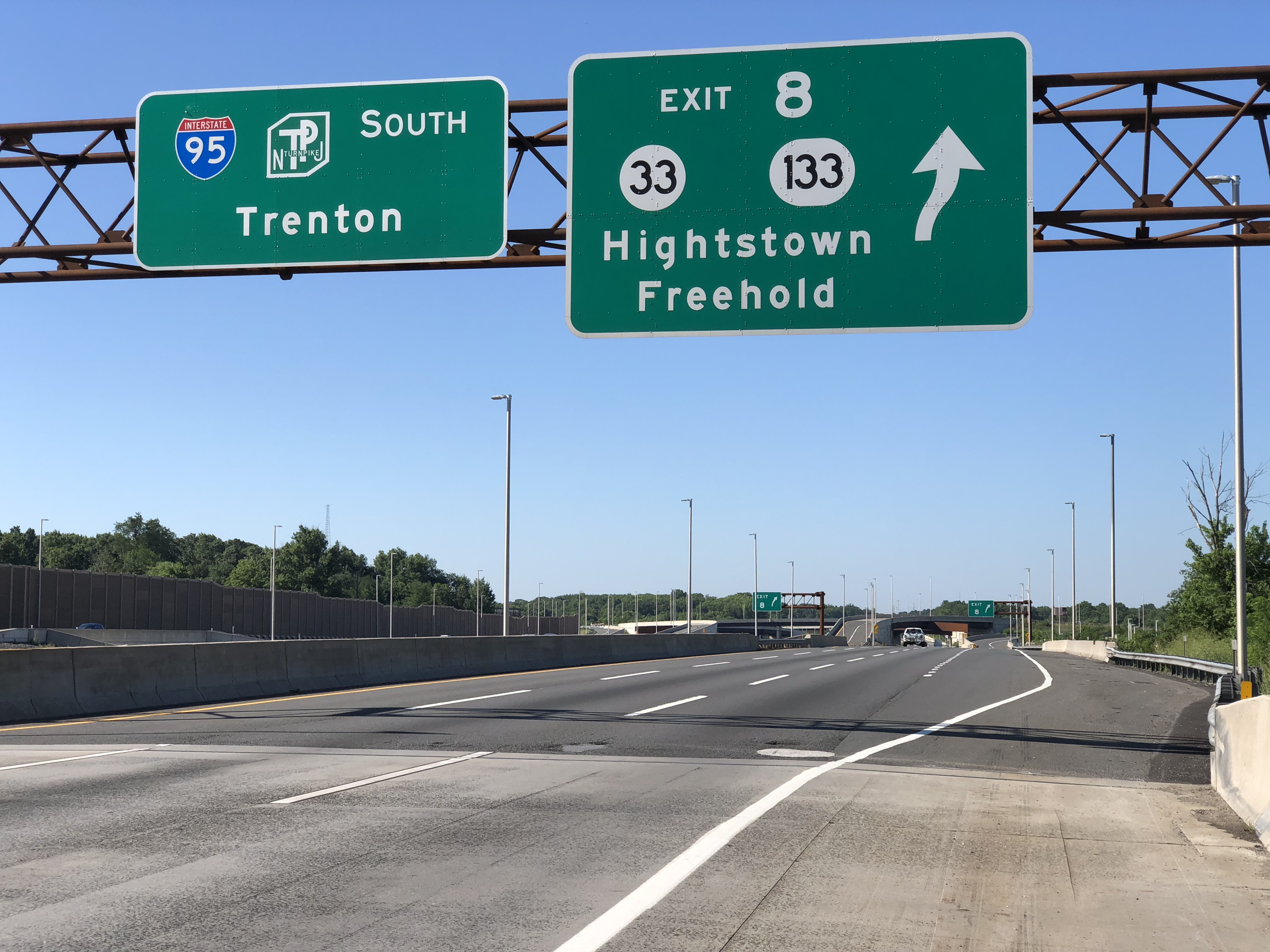
New Jersey Turnpike (I-95) southbound at the Route 33/Route 133 interchange in East Windsor Township

While continuing up to the Meadowlands, the crossings were harder because of the fertile marsh land of silt and mud. Near the shallow mud, the mud was filled with crushed stone, and the roadway was built above the water table. In the deeper mud, caissons were sunk down to a firm stratum and filled with sand, then both the caissons and the surrounding areas were covered with blankets of sand. Gradually, the water was brought up, and drained into adjacent meadows. Then, construction of the two major bridges over the Passaic and Hackensack Rivers was completed. The bridges were built to give motorists a clear view of the New York City skyline, but with high retaining walls to create the illusion of not being on a river crossing. The 6,955 ft (2,120 m) Passaic River (Chaplain Washington) Bridge cost $13.7 million to build; the 5,623 ft (1,714 m) Hackensack River Bridge cost $9.5 million.

The entire 118-mile (190 km) length of the New Jersey Turnpike took 25 months to construct, at a total cost of $255 million. The first 44-mile-long (71 km) stretch, from exit 1 in Carneys Point Township north to exit 5 in Westampton Township, opened on November 5, 1951. A second 49-mile-long (79 km) stretch from exit 5 north to exit 11 in Woodbridge opened on November 30, 1951, followed by a third 16-mile-long (26 km) stretch from exit 11 north to exit 15E in Newark on December 20, 1951. The fourth and final nine-mile-long (14 km) stretch, from exit 15E north to exit 18 in Ridgefield, opened on January 15, 1952, completing the turnpike. After the turnpike was completed in 1952, the NJTA and the New York State Thruway Authority (NYSTA) proposed a 13-mile (21 km) extension of the New Jersey Turnpike that would run from its end (at US 46 in Ridgefield Park at the time) up to West Nyack, New York, at I-87 (New York State Thruway). The section through New Jersey was to be constructed and maintained by the NJTA, while the section in New York was to be built and maintained by the NYSTA. The purpose of this extension was to give motorists a "more direct bypass of the New York City area" to New England, by using the Tappan Zee Bridge. The extension was to parallel New York State Route 303 (NY 303) and the present-day CSX River Subdivision, and have limited interchanges. It was to have an interchange with the Palisades Interstate Parkway and at Interstate 87 (New York State Thruway) in West Nyack. This project did not survive; by 1970, it became too expensive to buy right-of-way access, and community opposition was fierce. Therefore, the NJTA and the NYSTA canceled the project. NJDOT did construct a small segment of this extension, the portion between US 46 and I-80, as part of the I-95 Extension. This segment was later transferred to the NJTA.

=== 1950s to 1980s ===
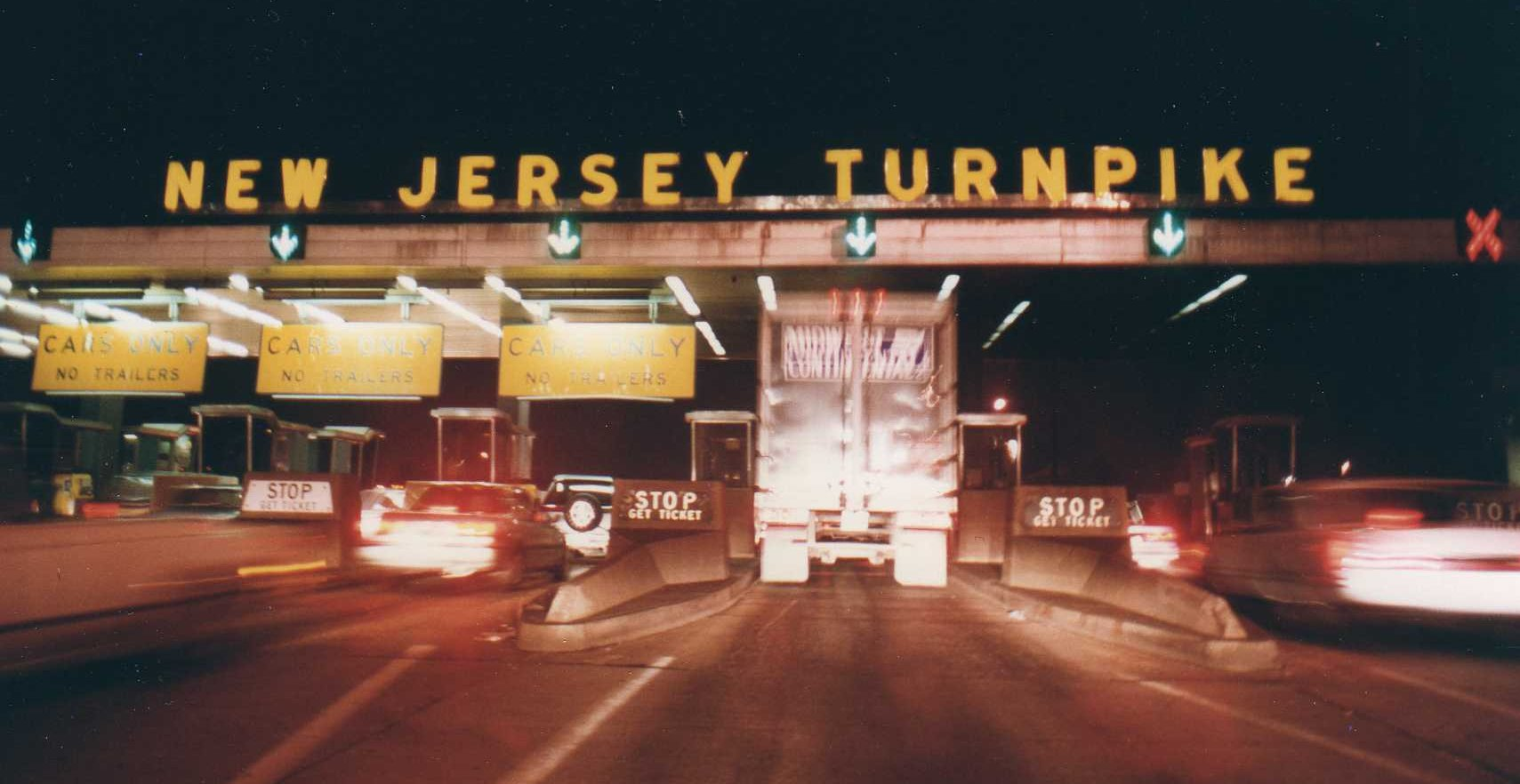
Approaching the exit 11 tollbooths at night in 1992, prior to the installation of E-ZPass

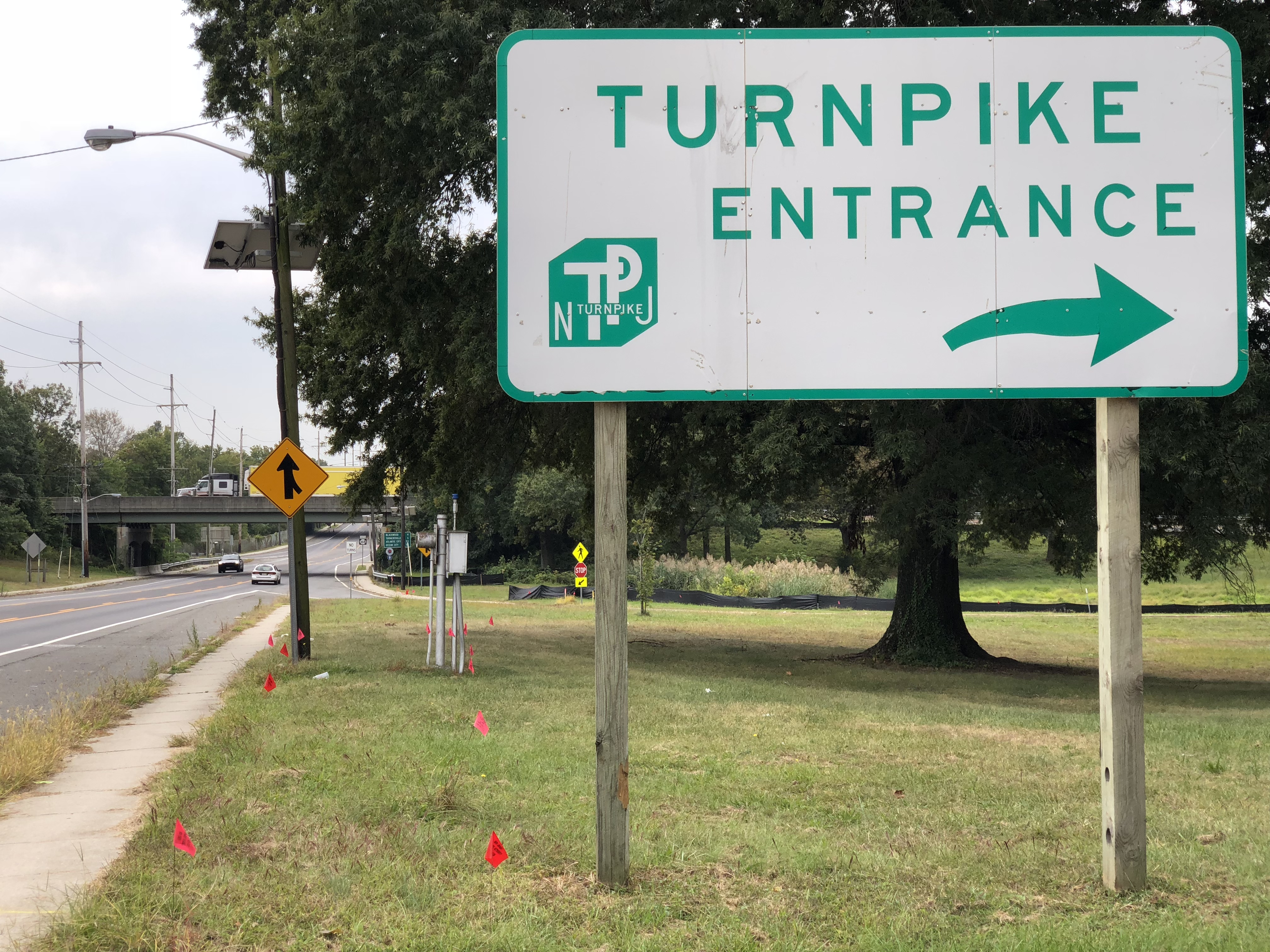
Old format of the sign which had been typical at non-freeway entrances to the turnpike; this one is at exit 3. This sign was replaced by a generic entry sign in 2024.

With the turnpike completed, traffic increased beyond expectations, which prompted planning for two widenings in 1955. The first of these would widen the segment of roadway between exit 10 and exit 14 from four lanes to an eight-lane, dual-dual setup (2-2-2-2, two express carriageways and two local carriageways in each direction). The second widening added a third lane in each direction between exit 4 and exit 10, making for a total of six lanes combined. On April 4, 1956, the widening between exit 10 and exit 14 was completed. Also as part of this project, exit 14 was rebuilt from a standard exit that served US 1-9 into the 8.2-mile-long (13.2 km) Newark Bay Extension. On May 25 of that year, the widening between exit 4 and exit 10 was completed, along with this came the six-mile (9.7 km) Pearl Harbor Memorial Extension linking exit 6 on the mainline with the Delaware River-Turnpike Toll Bridge and Pennsylvania Turnpike.

In 1958, a part of the turnpike was designated as I-95. In addition, a short part of the southern segment was signed as I-295, and the Newark Bay Extension was signed as I-78.

On May 15, 1962, the authority opened a new trumpet interchange at exit 12. The ramps, which replaced the nonstandard half-diamond interchange at the location, cost $3,500,000 (equivalent to $27.7 million in 2024) to construct, and unlike the old ramps, contained a southbound exit and northbound entrance.

On August 7, 1962, the NJTA announced a major project to replace exits 17 and 18, in addition to expanding exit 16's toll plaza. This work was being done in preparation for the 1964 World's Fair. It would involve moving the northern end of the ticket system from Ridgefield to Secaucus, as well as replacing the partially at-grade exits 17 with a new grade separated exits 17 in order to reduce congestion and upgrade said road to Interstate Highway standards. It would also involve replacement of the exit 16 toll plaza with a new 24-lane-wide structure, and relocating exit 18 to be at the new northern end of the ticket system near exit 16. Construction on the new exit 17 began immediately. The original exit 17 had its northbound ramps permanently closed on June 16, 1963, to allow construction of the replacement exit 16 toll plaza to proceed. On September 19, at 3:30 p.m., the new exit 17 was completed. It contained a wider toll plaza, was fully grade separated, was located slightly father to the north, and operated on a coin drop system rather than the ticket system like the rest of the road, with trucks, buses, and trailers charged based on their weight. It was at this point that the original exit 18 toll plaza located in Ridgefield was demolished. The new exit 18, which had more collection lanes than the original and was located in Secaucus, began charging tolls on February 25, 1964, concurrent with opening of the new exit 16 toll plaza. Another improvement made was the introduction of automatic ticket dispensers with the new exit 18 and exit 16. These were also later installed at exits 14, 14A, and 14C, as well as the exit 6 toll barrier. On May 29, the entrance ramps from Route 3 were opened, completing the two-year long project.

In 1965, construction began on an entirely new interchange with the under-construction Route 32 between exits 8 and 7. On February 14, 1966, this interchange, numbered as exit 8A was opened to traffic, though only partially; the connection to Route 32 westbound opened on November 5 at noon.

In November 1966, NJTA announced plans to widen the turnpike between exits 10 and 14 from eight to twelve lanes. This abolished the express-local roadway system and established a new system, with the outer roadway for all vehicles and inner roadway for cars only. Other aspects of the plan included constructing a new exit 10 in Edison Township, closing old exit 10 and rebuilding exit 11 to provide access to the Garden State Parkway in Woodbridge, reversing the trumpet at exit 12 in Carteret, and relocating exit 13 in Elizabeth to provide direct access to the Goethals Bridge and I-278 instead of Trenton Road. On July 27, 1968, it was announced that the replacement exit 13 would open on July 31. The interchange was opened as planned, and the old exit, which was a split interchange with Trenton Avenue, was closed permanently and slated for reverse engineering, this was completed by October. The new exit 11 was completed on September 18, 1969, at which point the original exit 10 was closed. The new exit 10 was opened on January 13, 1970, with new dual-dual setup opened the next day on January 14. The Western Spur, a new extension of the turnpike meant to let through traffic bypass Secaucus, was opened on September 3, 1970. With this, multiple changes were made to the existing roadway. It was officially named the Eastern Spur, new unnumbered interchanges connecting it with the Western Spur were built, as well as a major renumbering to make it consistent with the new spur scheme, exit 15 was renumber exit 15E, exit 16 as exit 16E, and exit 18 as exit 18E. They also built exit 15W's connection with the original road, and rebuilt exit 15E to provide access to Western Spur traffic. With the Bergen-Passaic Expressway being built on the north side of Ridgefield Park in 1964, this left a mile-long gap between the turnpike and expressway approaches onto the George Washington Bridge. This gap was closed on October 20, 1971, when an expanded interchange with US 46 was opened, which connected to the Bergen-Passaic Expressway and replaced the trumpet interchange that only served US 46.

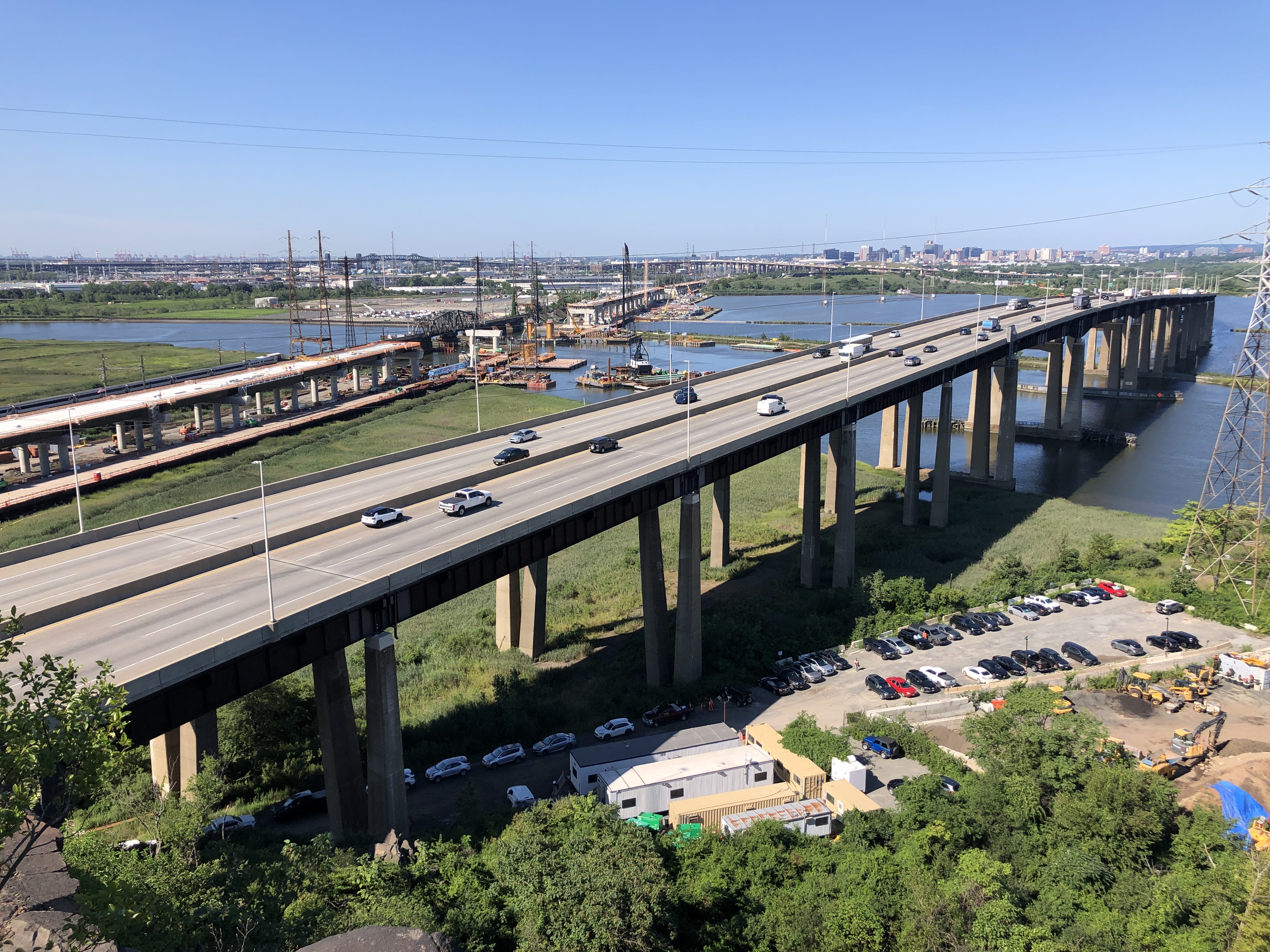
The Hackensack River Bridge on the Eastern Spur, viewed from Snake Hill

The New Jersey Turnpike smog accident occurred in the town of Kearny, on October 23 and 24, 1973. The first collision occurred at 11:20 p.m. EDT on the 23rd. Further accidents continued to occur until 2:45 a.m. the next day as cars plowed into the unseen accident ahead of them. Sixty-six vehicles were involved, and nine people died as a result. Thirty-nine suffered non-fatal injuries. The primary cause of the accident was related to a fire consisting of burning garbage, aggravated by foggy conditions. This produced an area of extremely poor visibility.

In 1971, the authority announced plans to extend the dual-dual setup from exit 10 in Woodbridge to exit 9 in East Brunswick. This project was completed northbound on November 14, 1973, and southbound on January 13, 1974, and involved a major reconstruction of exit 9, replacing the underpass with an overpass and building a wider toll plaza to replace the existing one.

On May 30, 1974, exit 7A was opened to traffic. The interchange, which had been planned for since 1973, connected to I-195, allowing for turnpike traffic to access the nearby Six Flags Great Adventure, which opened later that year. Additionally, in June, a widening of exit 15E's toll plaza was completed, with an expansion of exit 14A's following in August.

With the completion of I-78 to the Newark Bay Extension on May 27, 1977, the interchanges toll plaza was replaced with a wider one and ramps replaced, and none of the original 1951 configuration remained.

In 1971, the NJTA proposed building the Alfred E. Driscoll Expressway. It was to start at the Garden State Parkway south of exit 80 in Dover Township (now Toms River) and end at the turnpike approximately three miles (4.8 km) north of exit 8A in South Brunswick. As a proposed part of the turnpike system, its seven interchanges would have included toll plazas except at the northern end of the turnpike. By 1972, the proposed road met fierce opposition from Ocean, Monmouth, and Middlesex counties with quality of life as the main concern. The NJTA proceeded anyway and began selling bonds. But by December 1973, Governor-elect Brendan Byrne decided to stop the project altogether. Despite this, the authority continued with its plan. It was not until February 1977 that the authority abandoned its plan to build the road. The rights-of-way were sold in 1979, shelving the project indefinitely.

In 1973, the NJTA began planning for exit 13A. The interchange would be constructed in order to provide direct connections to the nearby Newark Liberty International Airport, which had previously required taking convoluted routes via exit 13 or 14. On June 10, 1982, this exit was opened to traffic.

In the 1987, the authority announced a plan a to rebuild the Western Spur. If this were ever to be completed, it would have added truck lanes. In addition, a new exit 15 W-A would be constructed, which would have served an extension of Route 17, and exit 16W would have its ramps connecting to the turnpike be entirely replaced by a new ramp containing a wider toll plaza. However, this project was never carried out, in part due to the cancellation of the Route 17 Extension.

=== 1990s to present ===
In July 1988, a project to reconstruct exit 7 in order to accommodate an increasing number of trucks was announced. As part of this, a new 12-lane toll plaza and trumpet interchange located 1/2 mile (0.80 km) away from the original ramps were to be constructed, and the existing toll plaza was demolished, though the old overpass would be left intact as a U-turn ramp. Construction began almost immediately, and was completed in 1990, costing $30 million.

In 1985, the authority announced plans to extend the dual-dual roadway to exit 8A in Monroe Township. However, this created some problems in the East Brunswick area. Analysis of noise and air quality impacts were made in a lawsuit decided in New Jersey Superior Court. This case, in the early 1970s, was one of the early examples of environmental scientists playing a role in the design of a major highway in the US. The computer models allowed the court to understand the effects of roadway geometry, in this case width, vehicle speeds, proposed noise barriers, residential setback and pavement types. The outcome was a compromise that involved substantial mitigation of noise pollution and air pollution impacts. Groundbreaking for this project began on June 23, 1987. Construction of the dual-dual roadway setup was completed on October 22, 1990, the rebuilding of Exit 8A from a trumpet into T-intersection to a dual trumpet interchange was completed in May 1991.

In January 1992, the turnpike was extended by four miles (6.4 km) from I-95 exit 68 to exit 72B, NJDOT had sold this segment of roadway to balance the state budget.

In 1996, an HOV lane was opened between exits 11 and exits 14 on the truck lanes. The cost of this project was $361 million. It is reserved for use only during peak hours. By 1997, various improvements had also been made to the 1.5-mile (2.4 km) stretch between exits 14 and exits 15E in Newark. This part of the project cost $148 million. On September 24 of that year, the Pennsylvania connector was officially renamed the Pearl Harbor Memorial Extension, this was done in remembrance of the Americans who died during the attack on Pearl Harbor.

In May 1998, the speed limit was increased from 55 to 65 miles per hour (89 to 105 km/h) between exits 1 and exits 13. Despite this, no other segment north of it had its speed limit raised.

In the late 1990s, a project to improve exit 13A in Elizabeth was started. It was completed in 1999, at the cost of $140 million. It was funded by the developers of Jersey Gardens, its construction was why the upgrade was carried out. Later that year, a bill to rename the mainline road as the New Jersey Veterans Turnpike was proposed by the New Jersey General Assembly. Proposed by Jack Collins, this memorial would have resulted in $500,000 worth of signage being replaced. Despite passing the assembly, it was never signed into law.

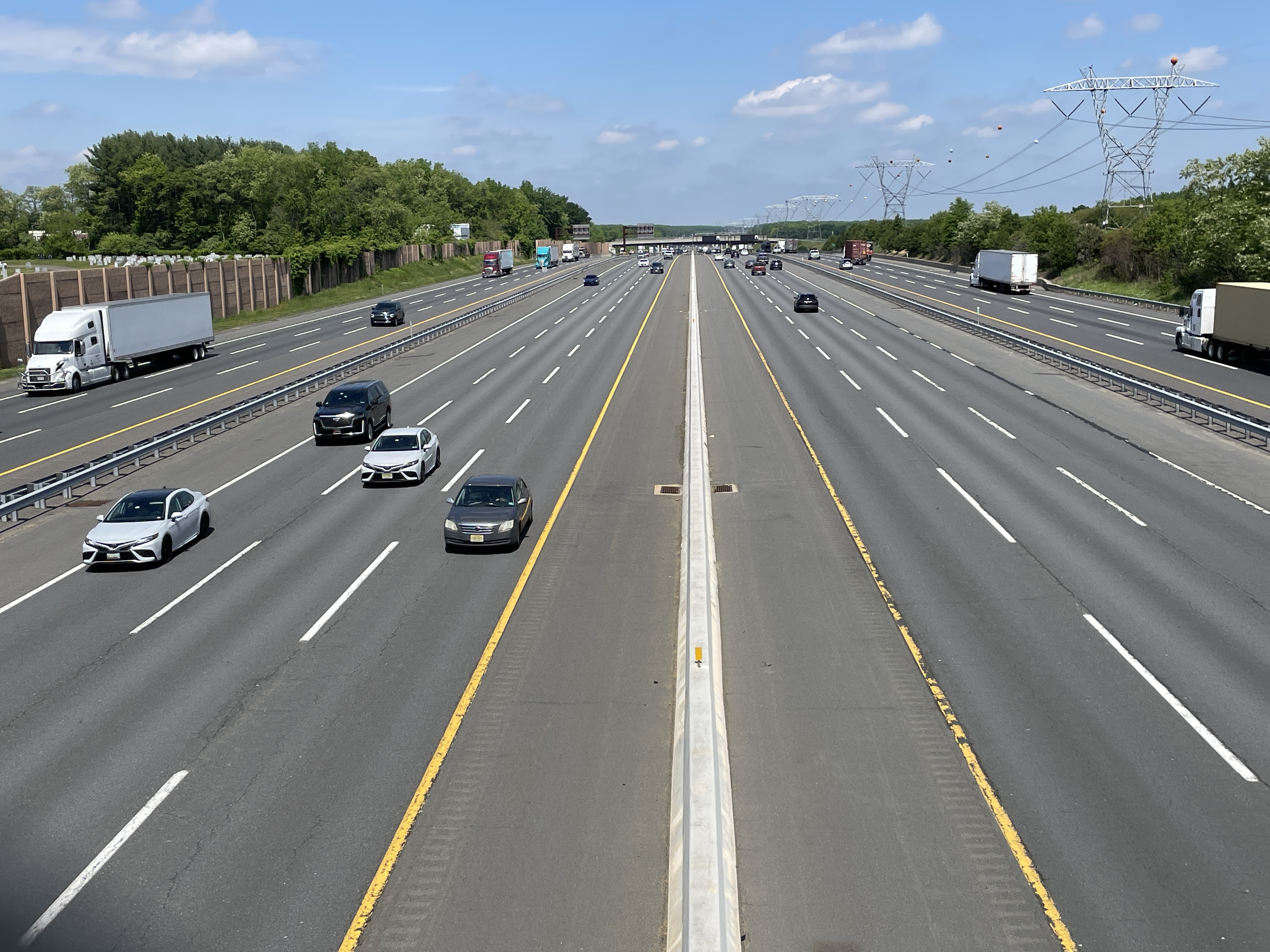
New Jersey Turnpike (I-95) northbound in Robbinsville Township

In October 1997, groundbreaking was held on a project to reconstruct the Pearl Harbor Memorial Extension. As part of this project, a new interchange with US 130 was built that was completed on December 17, 1999, replacing the old slip ramp in the area that fed onto local streets with many potholes. in addition, the toll plaza was replaced with a new wider one that contained E-ZPass lanes, this part of the project was completed in February 2000.

On September 30, 2000, NJTA began using E-ZPass for electronic toll collection on the mainline. Discounts were available to all users of the E-ZPass system until 2002. The cost to implement the E-ZPass system forced the NJTA to eliminate the discounts during peak hours and instead impose a $1 per month E-ZPass fee to account holders.

A replacement exit 1 toll barrier was completed in July 2004. Planned since the 1990s, the new plaza features 23 lanes, a walkway to allow for the toll collectors to avoid crossing traffic, and four high-speed E-ZPass lanes (two in each direction). Construction of the plaza had started in early 2001, and had cost $44 million to construct. The plaza was located approximately 1.2 miles (1.9 km) north of the original toll gate.

In 2003, the E-ZPass system was extensively overhauled when the turnpike's E-ZPass transitioned to ACS State and local solutions. Also in 2002, the authority proposed adding express lanes to the Eastern and Western Spurs. In January 2004, the authority opened the new 18W express gantries in Carlstadt; these allowed for two 45 mph (72 km/h) lanes in each direction, though were restricted to EZ-Pass users only.

On December 1, 2005, the authority opened exit 15X on the Eastern Spur, providing access to Secaucus Junction.

In order to address chronic congestion, the authority opened a new two lane ramp at exit 8A to carry traffic onto the newly extended CR 535 in February 2006. The ramp that allowed traffic onto Route 32 westbound was then closed off permanently (though not demolished); despite redundancy, the eastbound ramp was left intact. In May 2006, hybrid vehicles were permitted to use the HOV lanes during peak periods. The authority planned to build Route 92, an east–west spur from US 1 and Ridge Road in the township of South Brunswick to the mainline of the turnpike at exit 8A in Monroe Township. This proposition was canceled on December 1, 2006. The year also saw the completion of a project to expand exits 16E and 18E.

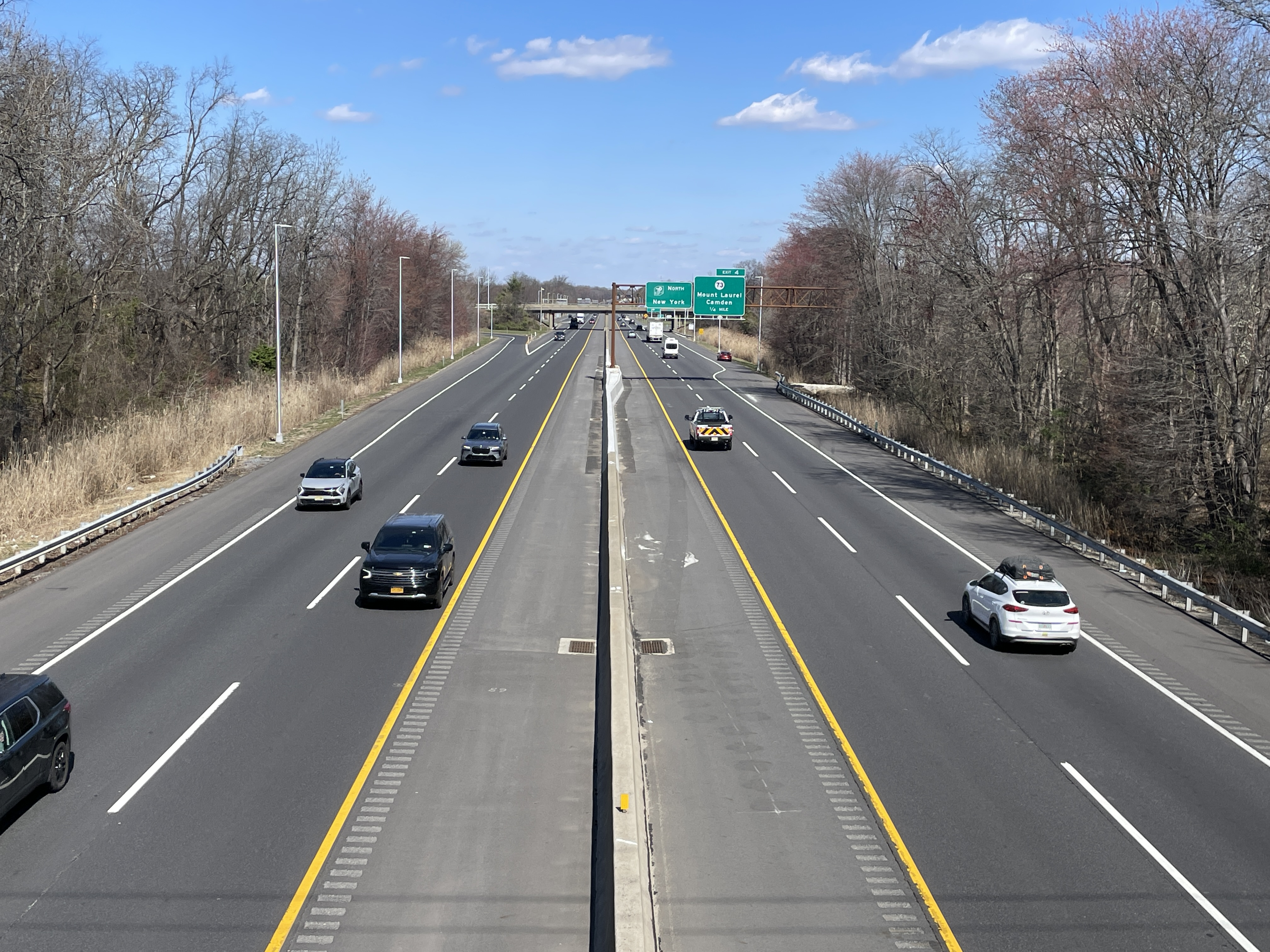
New Jersey Turnpike northbound approaching the Route 73 interchange in Mount Laurel

In 2005, the authority began to lower the Eastern Spur (between mileposts 107.3 and 107.5) in Newark. This project, completed in 2008, made it so that the spur consisted of a minimum 15-foot (4.6 m) vertical clearance and 12-foot (3.7 m) horizontal clearance on the shoulders underneath the Pulaski Skyway (U.S. Route 1/9).

In March 2010, the authority completed a project that rebuilt exit 16W in East Rutherford. Several new ramps were built, and old ones were demolished. One major modification was demolishing the old ramp from the tollgate to Route 3 west and constructing a new elevated ramp that swings around in the opposite direction to merge with Route 3 west, thereby completing the double trumpet-like interchange and reducing weaving on Route 3. In April, the NJTA completed a project that rebuilt exit 12 in Carteret. The project, carried out in order to reduce truck traffic, involved constructing new elevated ramps from Roosevelt Avenue east to the toll gate, replacing what was previously a fully an at-grade interchange with a unidirectional one. In addition, the seven-lane toll booth was demolished, and a new 17-lane one was constructed in its place. While it initially planned to be completed in November or December 2009, though was delayed five to six months behind schedule.

The NJTA began accepting E-ZPass at all toll lanes on March 5, 2011, previously only marked lanes allowed for such. In the middle of that year, the authority also reconstructed the Route 495 westbound overpass across the turnpike at exit 16E in Secaucus in order to add a third lane to said ramp.

In late 2012, the authority completed a project that made many safety improvements to exit 2 in Woolwich Township. A traffic signal at the T-intersection with US 322, and turn lanes were added, in addition, a fourth access point was also constructed.

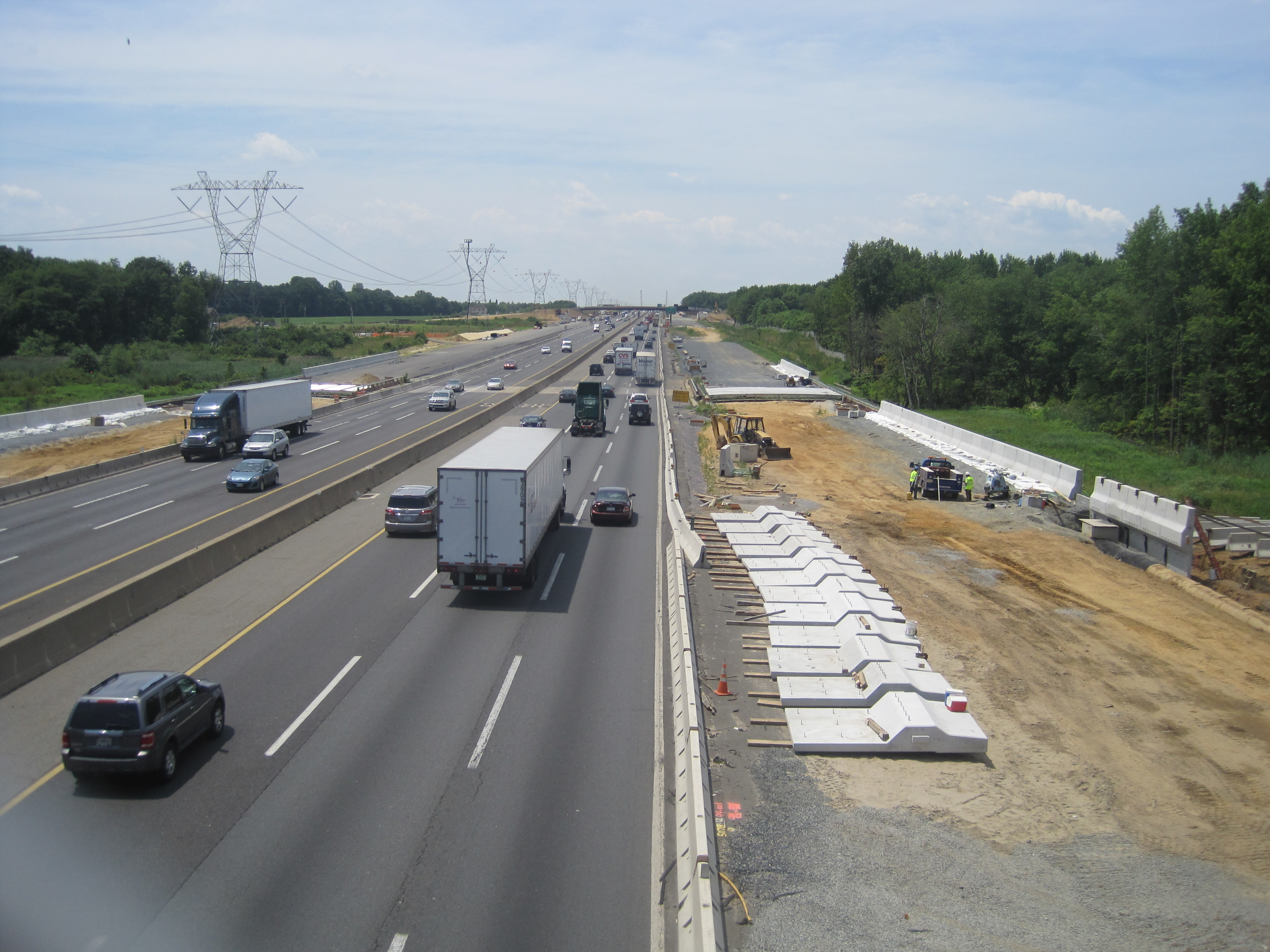
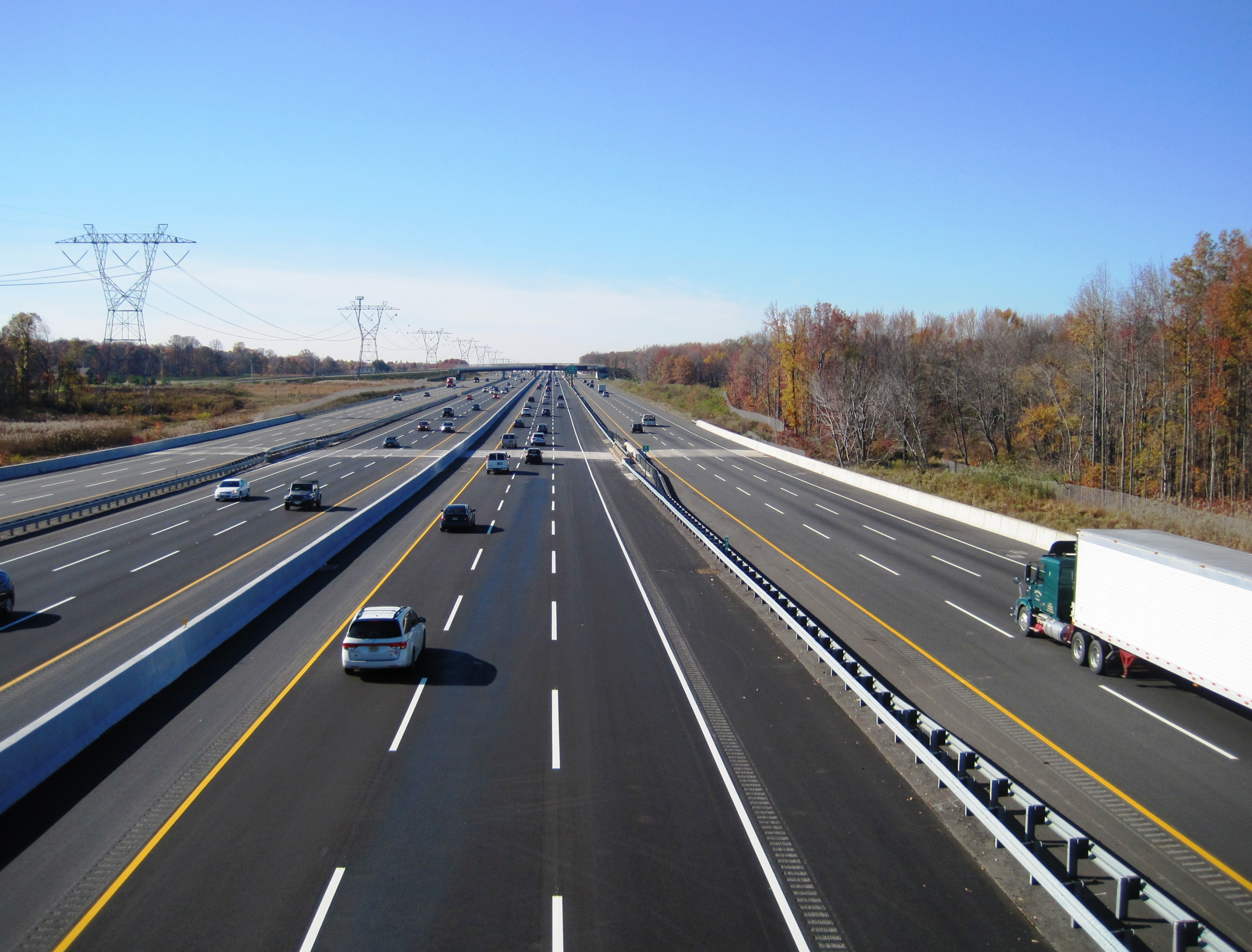
Widening from 6 to 12 lanes in Robbinsville. Top, July 2012. Bottom, November 2014.

Three proposals for new Exit 8 in East Windsor. Alternative 1 was chosen (with a few changes)

In November 2004, Governor Richard Codey advocated a plan to widen the turnpike by extending the dual-dual configuration 20.1 miles (32.3 km) south from exit 8A in Monroe Township to exit 6 in Mansfield Township. This was to be completed by 2014 when Pennsylvania was supposed to finish an interchange, that would connect its turnpike to the existing I-95 in Bristol Township, Pennsylvania. Finances were to be supplied by rerouting money from the planned Route 92 Turnpike extension. On January 1, 2007, the NJTA released its plan for exit 8 in East Windsor Township. The old interchange, located west of the turnpike, would be demolished and replaced with a new one located to the east of the turnpike. Other interchanges were also to be upgraded with this widening project. Exit 6 in Mansfield Township would have its dual two laned ramps replaced by multiple pairs of single lane ramps, exit 7 in Bordentown Township would have new depressed ramps added, exit 7A in Robbinsville Township would have three extra collection lanes added to its gate, and exit 8A in Monroe Township would have a new ramp added. The NJTA would also add a third truck lane between exit 9 in East Brunswick Township and exit 8A in Monroe Township. No overpass replacement was needed since overpasses were already designed with future expansion in mind. Only final preparation and paving of an outer lane in the outer roadways were required to accommodate the extra lane. New signage and lighting was installed as part of the widening project. It was thought that some transmission towers that ran near the turnpike would have to be replaced to make room for the newly constructed roadways. However, this idea was dismissed because it would have been cost prohibitive, and the towers, in fact, did not need to be. The widened turnpike features six lanes in each direction (3-3-3-3), double the previous capacity. The new exit 8 opened in January 2013, featuring a new toll plaza consisting of 10 lanes, with direct access to Route 133 (Hightstown Bypass) without going through any traffic lights, as well as to Route 33 by using a grade-separated interchange. Construction of a realigned Milford Road, near the interchange, was open to traffic in October 2011. Milford Road was converted into an overpass crossing over the new interchange 8 ramp. The junction with the realigned Milford Road, Route 33 and Monmouth Street was also modified. On July 2, 2009, a ceremonial groundbreaking took place near exit 8 to initiate the widening of the turnpike. On January 28, 2014, the last two of the project's 31 construction contracts was awarded. On May 17–18, 2014, the NJTA switched traffic from the inner roadway for the new outer roadway to do repairs and resurfacing of the inner roadway. The rehabilitated northbound lanes opened on October 26, 2014, while the southbound lanes opened a week later on November 3, 2014. The final cost reported to be $2.3 billion. The project employed 1,000 workers a day, and at one point was the largest active road construction project in the Western Hemisphere.

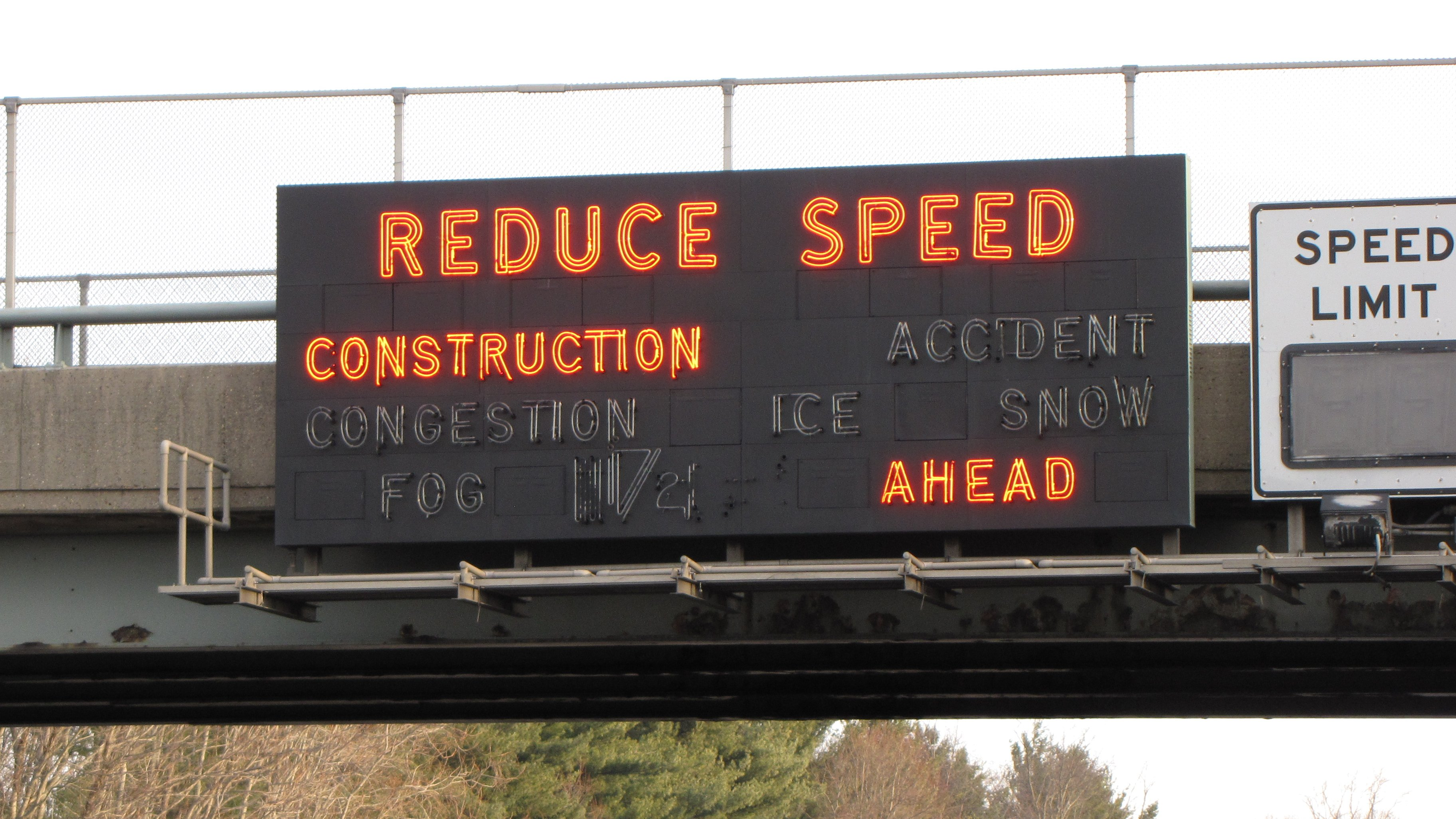
A 1970s variable-message sign displaying a warning about construction ahead. These signs have since been replaced.

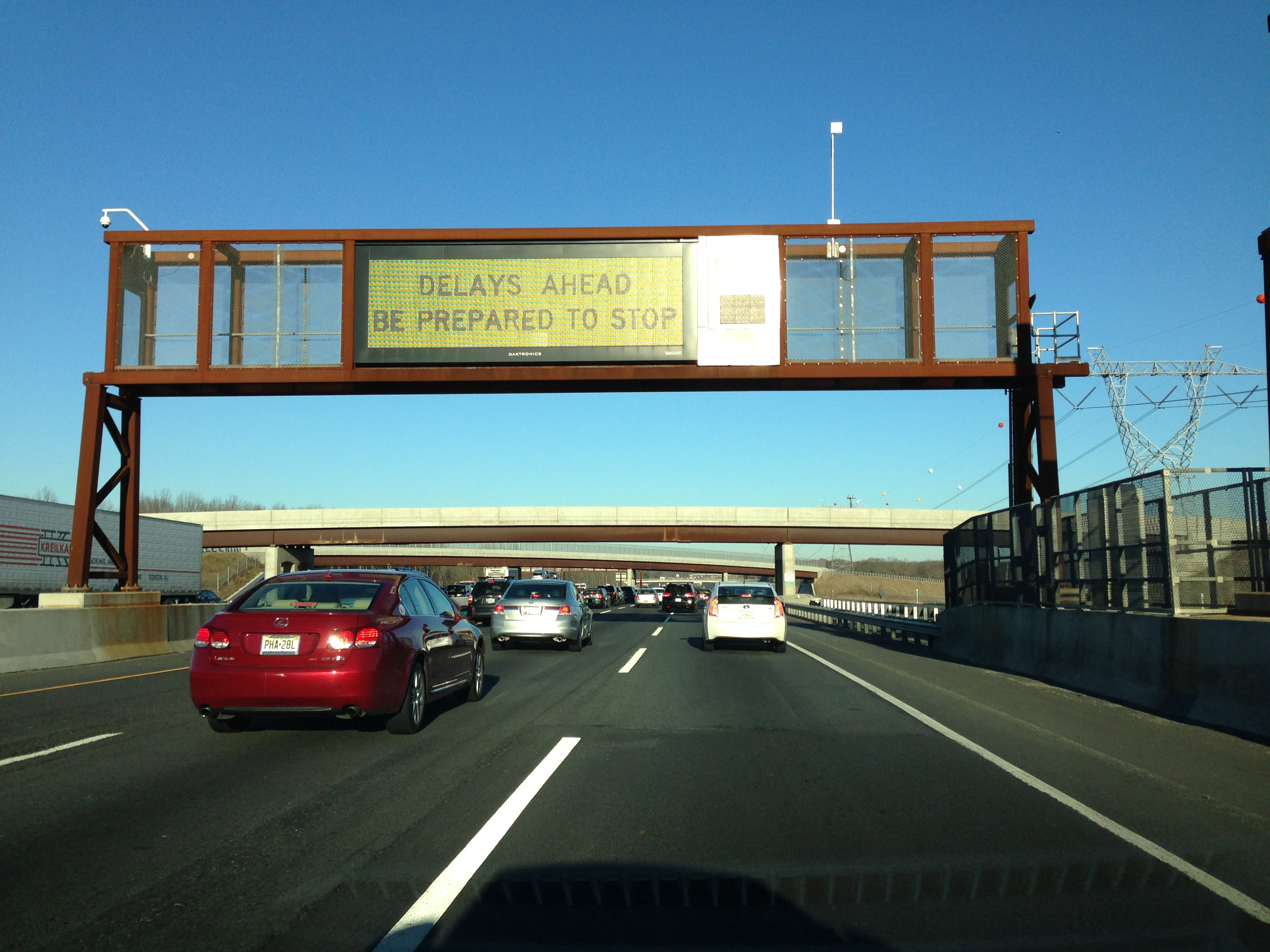
A modern variable message sign near Exit 7A displaying a warning about congestion

All of the turnpike's original variable-message signs (VMS) were replaced from 2010 to 2015, and many new signs were also added. The replacement signs, which feature full graphic color matrix technology, are more up-to-date and feature travel times to major routes when not otherwise in use.

In late October 2015, the southbound inner roadway exit ramp at exit 7A was closed to make repairs to the overpass crossing over the truck lanes. Steel plates beneath the deck of the exit ramp overpass "were not built to specification" when it was originally constructed, and to avoid premature replacement in the future, the ramps were repaired. These repairs were completed in late November 2015.

To reduce congestion, the NJTA has widened Route 18 and reconstructed all the associated ramps at exit 9 (except the ramp to Route 18 north) in East Brunswick Township. Construction began in late 2012 and was completed in mid-2016.

The authority planned to reconstruct exit 14A in Jersey City and its connectors in Bayonne because the interchange was in "poor condition" and suffered from chronic congestion. This was part of a bigger project to address future traffic volume along Route 440. Official groundbreaking occurred on March 11, 2015, with an expanded toll plaza and connector bridge targeted for completion in late 2018 with a $310 million budget. The newly expanded exit 14A reopened in May 2018 ahead of its anticipated opening later in the year.

On September 22, 2018, following the completion of an interchange between I-95 and the Pennsylvania Turnpike in Pennsylvania, I-95 was rerouted over the Delaware River Turnpike-Toll Bridge, closing a gap that had existed on I-95 within New Jersey due to the cancellation of the Somerset Freeway. Signage on the New Jersey Turnpike for I-95 was extended from I-195 at exit 7A in Robbinsville Township to exit 6, the Pearl Harbor Memorial Extension was also signed.

In conjunction with the Port Authority of New York and New Jersey's replacement of the Goethals Bridge, improvements were being studied at exit 13 in Elizabeth and Linden. However, the interchange was ultimately left as is, with no improvements being made.

On March 24, 2020, the NJTA temporarily suspended cash toll collection due to the COVID-19 pandemic. Drivers without E-ZPass transponders had their license plates photographed at the toll plazas and were sent bills in the mail. Cash collection resumed on May 19 of that year.

In January 2020, the NJTA announced plans to construct E-ZPass express lanes at exit 18E. This project was completed in November 2021. Additionally, the toll plaza at exit 6 was reconfigured in order to add a second E-ZPass express lane in each direction, as the original configuration had become obsolete.

From late April to May 2022, the ramps onto US 206 at exit 7 were temporarily closed so the overpass could be demolished.

On June 9, 2023, the American Association of State Highway and Transportation Officials (AASHTO) approved redesignating the Eastern Spur as I-695 and officially designating the Western Spur as I-95. However, as of 2026, no physical signage for I-695 has been erected.

In late 2025, the branch lanes at the exit 11 toll plaza were removed.

In June 2026, a maintenance-only U-turn located a mile north of the exit 18W toll plaza was opened to public use. Initially implemented for the FIFA World Cup, this ramp allows northbound E-ZPass users to access the Meadowlands Sports Complex via the E-ZPass-only ramps at exit 19W while bypassing congestion at the exit 16W toll plaza. The flat rate toll at exit 19W is waived for northbound E-ZPass users who pass through the southbound exit gantry within 20 minutes of passing through the exit 18W toll plaza.

== Future projects ==
=== Tremley Point Road Connector ===
The authority is planning a 1.1-mile (1.8 km) roadway called the "Tremley Point Road Connector" from Industrial Highway in Carteret to Tremley Point Road in Linden. The purpose of this extension is to increase truck access to the Tremley Point industrial area in Linden while moving trucks off local streets in residential neighborhoods. The authority chose this access road rather than a full interchange with Tremley Point Road from the turnpike mainline because of its proximity to both exits 12 and 13. The estimated completion date of the connector has yet to be determined, but as of October 2019, a construction contract has been awarded.

=== Exits 1 to 4 widening ===
The NJTA plans to widen the segment of roadway between exits 1 through 4 to six lanes, thus eliminating the final four-lane stretch of mainline roadway. Construction is planned to begin in 2025 and be completed in 2032. The widening, which has been in the planning stage since 1992, will also involve the replacement or rehabilitation of 55 overpasses, as well as improvements to exits 1 through 4. In addition to this, residents and congressmen are lobbying for the authority and NJDOT to construct a long-anticipated interchange between the turnpike with Route 42. This interchange would relieve tractor trailer traffic at exit 3 (Route 168), which creates massive backups as it is the only exit to Camden, Philadelphia, and southward. This proposed interchange will finally have a direct connection to the Atlantic City Expressway, I-76, and I-676, eliminating the requirement to travel through long suburban avenues with many traffic signals.

=== Other plans ===
The NJTA plans to widen the Newark Bay Extension from four to six lanes. This would involve replacing 29 bridge structures, including the Newark Bay Bridge, as they are in poor condition, functionally obsolete, and not designed to be widened. Construction on the first phase of the project is expected to begin in 2026 and to be completed sometime between 2032 and 2034, with the other three phases currently undetermined. There are also plans to widen the Western Spur from four lanes to six lanes, which would involve replacing many bridges, including the Harry Laderman Bridge. Long term plans call to convert the turnpike to all-electronic tolling, with the ticket system being replaced by license plate tolling for drivers not using E-ZPass. This would require demolishing conventional toll plazas in the process. There are also plans to extend the HOV lane past exit 13, as well as to replace an overpass carrying traffic at exit 17, as it has deteriorated significantly. Additionally, there are plans to replace the four lane wide Delaware River Bridge on the Pearl Harbor Memorial Extension with new twin three-lane twined cable-stayed bridges, with construction on this expected to begin sometime after 2030.

== Tolls ==
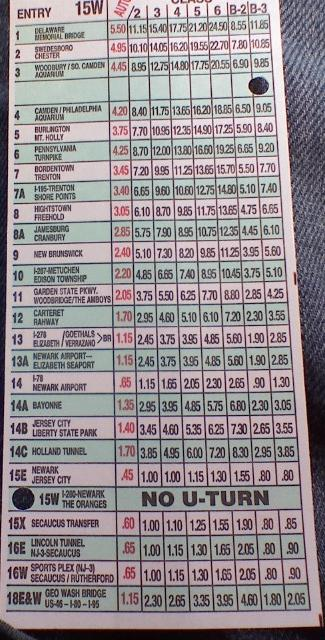
A toll ticket received at exit 15W in 2008

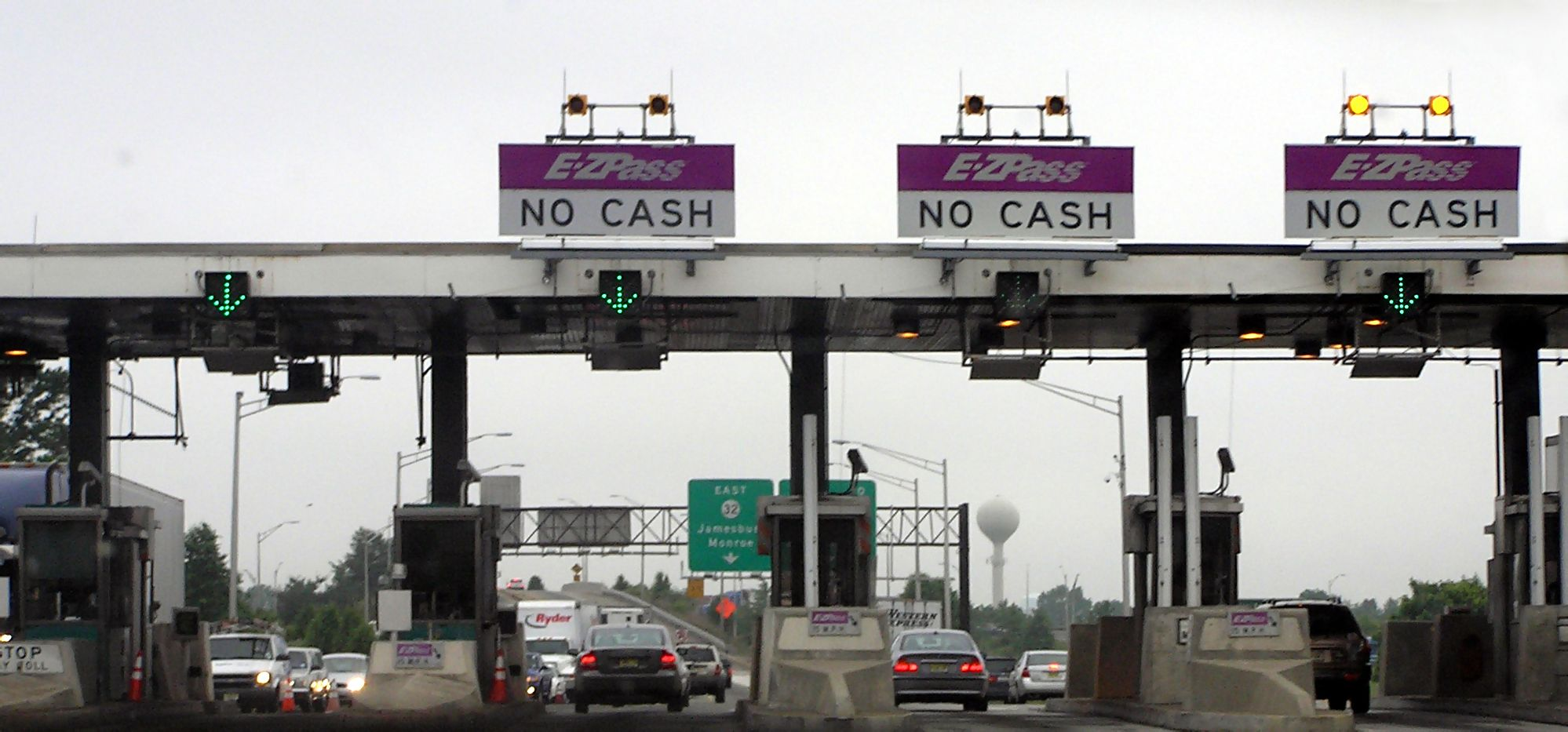
E-ZPass lanes at the toll plaza for Exit 8A in Monroe Township

The New Jersey Turnpike utilizes a ticket system, whereby drivers obtain a ticket upon entering the turnpike and surrender it upon exiting. Tolls are calculated based on the distance traveled and type of vehicle. If the ticket is lost, the driver must pay the highest toll fee upon exiting.

As of January 1, 2026, the automobile toll from exit 1 to exit 18 is $22 using cash and $21.88 using E-ZPass. At exit 6A on the Pearl Harbor Memorial Extension, a flat rate toll of $4.85 with cash and $4.78 with E-ZPass is charged for drivers entering southbound towards the Delaware River–Turnpike Toll Bridge. At exit 17 on the Eastern Spur, a toll of $4.50 with cash and $4.37 with E-ZPass is charged for drivers exiting southbound. Exit 19W on the Western Spur is reserved solely for E-ZPass users, who pay a flat rate toll of $2.29 entering northbound or exiting southbound. This toll is waived for northbound motorists.

During off-peak times (weekdays except between 7:00 am and 9:00 am, and between 4:00 pm and 6:00 pm), a 25% discount is provided to motorists with New Jersey-issued E-ZPass transponders, with a maximum toll of $16.41 for travel along the length of the mainline.

Four toll plazas on the turnpike have express E-ZPass lanes, allowing E-ZPass users to drive through toll areas at highway speeds. These high-speed toll gates are located at the northern terminus of the road on both the Western Spur and the Eastern Spur, the southern terminus in Carneys Point Township, and where I-95 enters the mainline at exit 6. At each location, traditional E-ZPass and cash lanes are also available. Every toll lane on the turnpike accepts E-ZPass.

The turnpike and the Garden State Parkway raised tolls in 2020 and 2021 and, in its 2023 budget, called for another toll increase of 7.4% in 2023. The NJTA said the increase was due to "pressures on discretionary travel and costs due to an inflation rate of 8.3%".

== Exit list ==
=== Mainline ===
As it was planned for from the start, the Eastern Spur is considered part of the mainline.

County	Location	mi	km	Exit	Destinations	Notes
Salem	Pennsville Township	0.00	0.00	–	I-295 Toll south / US 40 west (Delaware Memorial Bridge) to I-95 – Delaware	Continuation south; southern end of I-295/US 40 concurrency
Salem	Pennsville Township	0.22– 0.44	0.35– 0.71	1A	Route 49 east – Pennsville Township, Salem	Signed as exit 1 southbound; western terminus of Route 49; last southbound exit before toll
Salem	Pennsville Township	0.22– 0.44	0.35– 0.71	–	I-295 north / US 130 north – Camden, Trenton, Penns Grove	Northern end of I-295 concurrency; northbound exit and southbound entrance; southern terminus of US 130
Salem	Carneys Point Township	1.12	1.80	–	US 40 east / Route 140 west / CR 540 – Atlantic City, Penns Grove, Deepwater	Northern end of US 40 concurrency; signed for US 40 northbound, Route 140/CR 540 southbound; last northbound exit before toll
Salem	Carneys Point Township	2.40	3.86	Exit 1 Toll Plaza (southern end of ticket system)		
Gloucester	Woolwich Township	12.80	20.60	2	US 322 – Swedesboro, Glassboro	
Camden	Runnemede	26.10	42.00	3	Route 168 to A.C. Expressway east – Camden	
Burlington	Mount Laurel	34.50	55.52	4	Route 73 – Mount Laurel, Camden	
Burlington	Westampton	44.10	70.97	5	Burlington, Mount Holly	Access via CR 541
Burlington	Mansfield Township	48.70	78.38	Southern terminus of the dual-roadway setup (inner roadway for cars only, outer roadway for cars, trucks, and buses)		
Burlington	Mansfield Township	51.00– 51.60	82.08– 83.04	6	I-95 Toll south / Pearl Harbor Extension west to I-276 Toll west / Penna Turnpike west – Philadelphia	Eastern terminus of Pearl Harbor Extension; southern end of I-95 concurrency
Burlington	Bordentown Township	53.30	85.78	7	US 206 – Bordentown, Trenton	
Mercer	Robbinsville Township	60.50	97.37	7A	I-195 – Trenton, Shore Points	Exit 6 on I-195
Mercer	East Windsor	67.50	108.63	8	Route 133 west to Route 33 – Hightstown, Freehold Borough	Eastern terminus of Route 133
Middlesex	Monroe Township–South Brunswick line	73.90	118.93	8A	Route 32 / CR 535 to US 130 – Jamesburg, Cranbury	CR 535 not signed
Middlesex	East Brunswick	83.40	134.22	9	Route 18 (CR 527) to US 1 – New Brunswick	
Middlesex	Raritan River	84.22	135.54	Basilone Memorial Bridge		
Middlesex	Edison	88.10	141.78	10	I-287 north / Route 440 north / CR 514 – Metuchen, Perth Amboy	Southern termini of I-287 and Route 440; CR 514 not signed; former exit 9A
Middlesex	Woodbridge Township	91.00	146.45	11	G.S. Parkway to US 9 – Woodbridge, Shore Points	Exit 129 on G.S. Parkway
Middlesex	Carteret	95.90	154.34	12	Carteret, Rahway	Access via CR 602
Union	Elizabeth	99.40	159.97	13	I-278 – Elizabeth, Staten Island	Access to Elizabeth via Route 439; exit 3A on I-278
Union	Elizabeth	101.60	163.51	13A	Newark Airport, Elizabeth Seaport	Access via Route 81
Essex	Newark	104.70	168.50	14-14C	I-78 / Newark Bay Extension east to US 1-9 – Newark Airport, Holland Tunnel	Signed as exits 14 (west) and 14A-C (east); western terminus of Newark Bay Extension; exit 14 on I-78
Essex	Newark	105.60	169.95	–	I-95 Toll north / N.J. Turnpike north (Western Spur) to I-280 west / Route 3 – George Washington Bridge, Sports Complex	Southern terminus of Route 95W; northbound exit and southbound entrance
Essex	Newark	106.90	172.04	15E	US 1-9 south / US 1-9 Truck north – Newark, Jersey City	Signed for US 1-9 southbound, US 1-9 Truck northbound; southern terminus of US 1-9 Truck
Hudson	Kearny	108.50– 108.80	174.61– 175.10	15W	I-280 west – Newark, Kearny	Southbound exit and northbound entrance; eastern terminus of I-280
Hudson	Secaucus	110.80	178.32	15X	Secaucus	Access via Seaview Drive
Hudson	Secaucus	112.30	180.73	16E	Route 495 east – Lincoln Tunnel	Northbound exit and southbound entrance; western terminus of Route 495; former I-495
Hudson	Secaucus	112.30	180.73	Exit 18E Toll Plaza (northern end of ticket system)		
Hudson	Secaucus	112.70	181.37	17	Route 495 east to Route 3 – Lincoln Tunnel, Secaucus	Tolled southbound exit; no southbound entrance; no northbound access to Route 495; access to Route 3 via CR 681; exit number not signed northbound
Bergen	Ridgefield			–	To I-80 west – Paterson	Northbound left exit and southbound entrance
Bergen	Ridgefield	116.80	187.97	–	I-95 Toll south / N.J. Turnpike south (Western Spur) to Route 3 – Sports Complex	Northern terminus of Route 95W; southbound exit and northbound entrance
Bergen	Ridgefield Park	117.20	188.62	68	US 46 / CR 39 – The Ridgefields, Palisades Park	No northbound entrance; no northbound access to CR 39; CR 39 not signed; exit number not signed northbound; last southbound exit before toll
Bergen	Ridgefield Park	117.20	188.62	–	I-95 north (N.J. Turnpike) – George Washington Bridge, New York City	Continuation north; northern end of I-95 concurrency
1.000 mi = 1.609 km; 1.000 km = 0.621 mi: Concurrency terminus; Incomplete access; Tolled

=== Pearl Harbor Memorial Turnpike Extension ===
The entire route is in Burlington County.

Location	mi	km	Exit	Destinations	Notes
Delaware River	0.00	0.00	–	I-95 south / Penna Turnpike west to I-276 Toll west – Philadelphia, Harrisburg	Continuation into Pennsylvania; western end of I-95 concurrency
Delaware River	0.00	0.00	Delaware River–Turnpike Toll Bridge (westbound toll in Pennsylvania)		
Florence Township	2.60	4.18	6A	US 130 – Florence, Burlington	Tolled westbound entrance; exit number not signed; last eastbound exit before toll
Florence Township			Exit 6 Toll Plaza (southern end of ticket system)		
Mansfield Township	6.55	10.54	–	I-95 Toll north / N.J. Turnpike – New York City, Camden, Wilmington	Eastern terminus; eastern end of I-95 concurrency; exit 6 on N.J. Turnpike
1.000 mi = 1.609 km; 1.000 km = 0.621 mi: Concurrency terminus; Tolled

=== Newark Bay Extension ===
County	Location	mi	km	Exit	Destinations	Notes
Essex	Newark	0.00	0.00	–	I-78 west / US 1-9 to US 22 west – Newark, Newark Airport, Clinton	Continuation west; western end of I-78 concurrency
Essex	Newark	0.00	0.00	Exit 14 Toll Plaza (western end of ticket system)		
Essex	Newark	0.30	0.48	14	I-95 Toll / N.J. Turnpike – New York, Trenton	Exits 14-14C on I-95 / Turnpike; exit number not signed eastbound
Newark Bay		2.30	3.70	Newark Bay Bridge		
Hudson	Jersey City	3.50	5.63	14A	Route 185 north / Route 440 – Bayonne	Access via Port Jersey Boulevard; Route 185 not signed
Hudson	Jersey City	5.50	8.85	14B	Jersey City, Liberty State Park	Access via Bayview Avenue
Hudson	Jersey City	5.90	9.50	Exit 14C Toll Plaza (eastern end of ticket system)		
Hudson	Jersey City	5.90	9.50	–	I-78 east – Holland Tunnel, Liberty Science Center, Light Rail Park-Ride	Continuation east; eastern end of I-78 concurrency; access to Science Center/Park-Ride via Jersey City Boulevard
1.000 mi = 1.609 km; 1.000 km = 0.621 mi: Concurrency terminus; Tolled

=== Western Spur ===
County	Location	mi	km	Exit	Destinations	Notes
Essex	Newark	104.70	168.50	–	I-95 Toll south / N.J. Turnpike south – Trenton	Southern terminus of the Western Spur
Essex	Newark			14-14C	To I-78 / Newark Bay Extension east / US 1-9 – Newark Airport, Holland Tunnel	Southbound exit and northbound entrance; signed as exits 14 (west) and 14A-C (east)
Essex	Newark	106.90	172.04	15E	US 1-9 south / US 1-9 Truck north – Newark, Jersey City	Southbound exit and northbound entrance; US 1-9 Truck not signed
Hudson	Kearny	108.50– 108.80	174.61– 175.10	15W	I-280 west – Newark, Kearny, The Oranges	Eastern terminus of I-280
Bergen	East Rutherford	112.70	181.37	16W	Route 3 / Route 120 west – Secaucus, Rutherford	Route 120 not signed
Bergen	Carlstadt	113.80	183.14	Exit 18W Toll Plaza (northern end of ticket system)		
Bergen	Carlstadt	114.07– 114.55	183.58– 184.35	19W	Meadowlands Complex, American Dream	No northbound exit; E-ZPass only-toll on southbound exit and northbound entrance; access via Connection Road
Bergen	Ridgefield			–	To I-80 west – Paterson	Northbound left exit and southbound entrance
Bergen	Ridgefield	116.80	187.97	–	I-95 north / N.J. Turnpike north to US 46 – George Washington Bridge, New York City	Northern terminus of the Western Spur
1.000 mi = 1.609 km; 1.000 km = 0.621 mi: Incomplete access; Tolled

=== Interstate 95 Extension ===
The entire route is in Bergen County.

Location	mi	km	Exit	Destinations	Notes
Ridgefield Park	117.20	188.62	–	I-95 Toll south / N.J. Turnpike south to Route 3 / Route 495 east – Newark	Continuation south; southern end of I-95 concurrency
Ridgefield Park	117.20	188.62	68	US 46 / CR 39 – The Ridgefields, Palisades Park	No northbound entrance; no northbound access to CR 39; CR 39 not signed; exit number not signed northbound; last southbound exit before toll
Ridgefield Park	117.80	189.58	68	Challenger Road	Northbound exit and entrance
Ridgefield Park			Southern end of express (Upper Level) lanes and local (Lower Level) lanes		
Teaneck	119.00– 119.40	191.51– 192.16	69	I-80 west to G.S. Parkway – Hackensack, Paterson	Southbound exit and northbound entrance; eastern terminus and exit 68B on I-80
Teaneck	119.00– 119.40	191.51– 192.16	70	Leonia, Teaneck	Signed as exits 70A (Leonia) and 70B (Teaneck) northbound; access via CR 56
Englewood	120.90	194.57	71	Englewood	Northbound exit and southbound entrance; access via Broad Avenue
Fort Lee	121.50	195.54	72	US 9W north to Palisades Parkway north – Fort Lee	Northbound exit and southbound entrance; southern terminus of US 9W
Fort Lee			72A	Route 4 west – Paramus	Southbound exit and northbound entrance; eastern terminus of Route 4
Fort Lee	122.40	196.98	72B	US 1-9 south / US 46 west – Palisades Park	Southbound exit and northbound entrance
Fort Lee	122.40	196.98	–	I-95 north / US 1-9 north (U.S. Route 46 east) to I-87 – George Washington Bridge, New York City	Continuation north; northern end of I-95 concurrency
1.000 mi = 1.609 km; 1.000 km = 0.621 mi: Incomplete access

== In popular culture ==
=== 21st century ===
- Somerdale-based Flying Fish Brewing currently makes the "Exit Series" of beers, which are named in honor of various New Jersey Turnpike exits, with each beer intended to be reflective of the communities in or near where the relevant exit is located.
- In 2015, lyrics on Passenger's song "Riding to New York" on the Whispers album describe a man riding a bike from Minnesota to New York City: "And fly through Pennsylvania and the Jersey Turnpike tolls."
- From 2009 to 2012, "Jersey Turnpike" was the name of a dance move created by Deena Nicole Cortese of Jersey Shore, which aired on MTV.
- From 1999 to 2007, the opening credits of every episode of The Sopranos, which aired on HBO, featured shots of Tony Soprano driving on the New Jersey Turnpike, including Exits 12, 13, 14-14C, and 15W.
- In 2011, the video game Need for Speed: The Run, a racing event starts on the Newark Bay Extension at Exit 14B before entering Jersey City and Liberty State Park and ending in the Holland Tunnel as the driver, who is the player of the game, is chased by police while driving into New York City.
- In 2001, the song "Where I Come From" by country singer Alan Jackson begins with the lyrics: "Well I was rollin' wheels and shiftin' gears 'round that Jersey Turnpike."
- In 2012, a prehistoric crocodylomorph Borealosuchus threeensis was named in a reference to Exit 3 of the New Jersey Turnpike, the closest highway exit to the fossil locality.

=== 20th century ===
- In 1999, on The West Wing episode "The State Dinner", character Leo McGarry responds to a truckers union representative who uses inappropriate language: "This is the White House. It's not the Jersey Turnpike."
- In 1999, in the film Being John Malkovich, characters are transported into John Malkovich's mind and then are suddenly dropped in a ditch beside the New Jersey Turnpike.
- In 1994, in the Seinfeld episode "The Big Salad", character Cosmo Kramer drives MLB player Steve Gendason, who he met while playing golf, along the New Jersey Turnpike, in a white Ford Bronco, in a low speed chase, with the police following behind. Kramer had angered Gendason in a golfing argument, which possibly caused him to commit murder. The scene satirizes the O.J. Simpson chase.
- In 1988, one of the promotional taglines in the film Moving is: "On the New Jersey Turnpike, no one can hear you scream."
- In 1986, The Dead Milkmen's album Eat Your Paisley! includes the song "Vince Lombardi Service Center," the name of a New Jersey Turnpike service center in Ridgefield, New Jersey, as a CD bonus track.
- In 1982, the Bruce Springsteen song, "State Trooper" on the Nebraska album, mentions the New Jersey Turnpike in its opening lyric: "New Jersey Turnpike, riding on a wet night. 'Neath the refinery's glow, out where the great black rivers flow."
- In 1981, the character "Paulie Herman" on Saturday Night Live, played by Joe Piscopo, was known for an ongoing show segment in which he says: "Are you from Jersey? I'm from Jersey. What exit?," referring to New Jersey Turnpike and Garden State Parkway exits.
- In 1975, the Bruce Springsteen song "Jungleland" on the Born to Run album mentions the New Jersey Turnpike in its lyrics: "Man, there's an opera out on the Turnpike. There's a ballet being fought out in the alley. Until the local cops, cherry tops, rips this holy night."
- In 1968, Simon & Garfunkel's song "America" includes the lyric: "Counting the cars on the New Jersey Turnpike."
- In 1966, the autobiographical Mamas & Papas song "Creeque Alley" includes the lines: "Standing on the turnpike, thumb out to hitchhike/Take her to New York right away," referring to a broke Mama Cass Elliot hitching a ride from Maryland back to New York City via the New Jersey Turnpike.
- In 1956, Chuck Berry's song "You Can't Catch Me" includes the lyrics: "New Jersey Turnpike in the/wee wee hours I was/rolling slowly 'cause of/drizzlin' showers."
