= Ole Singstad =

Norwegian-American engineer

- Born: Ole Knutsen Singstad; June 29, 1882; Rissa, Søndre Trondhjem, Norway
- Died: December 8, 1969 (aged 87); New York City, US
- Resting place: Green-Wood Cemetery, Brooklyn, New York, US
- Spouse: Else Johansen (m. 1912; died 1964)
- Children: 2
- Engineering career
- Projects: Holland Tunnel; Lincoln Tunnel; Queens–Midtown Tunnel; Brooklyn–Battery Tunnel
- Awards: Order of the Crown of Belgium; Order of St. Olav; Chilean Order of Merit

Ole Knutsen Singstad (June 29, 1882 – December 8, 1969) was a Norwegian-American civil engineer best known for his work on underwater vehicular tunnels in New York City. Singstad designed the ventilation system for the Holland Tunnel, which subsequently became commonly used in other automotive tunnels, and advanced the use of the immersed tube method of underwater vehicular tunnel building, a system of constructing the tunnels with prefabricated sections.

He also designed the Lincoln Tunnel, Queens–Midtown Tunnel, and Brooklyn–Battery Tunnel. By 1950, Singstad had designed and overseen the construction of more underwater tunnels than all other engineers combined. In 1946, the Triborough Bridge Authority under Robert Moses took over tunnel construction in New York, and Singstad was subsequently sidelined as Moses favored bridges over tunnels.

== Early life ==
Ole Singstad was born at Singstad farm in the Lensvik area of Rissa Municipality (now part of Orkland Municipality in Trøndelag county), Norway. He was the seventh of nine children born to Knut Jacobsen Singstad (May 17, 1831 – November 24, 1906) and Anne Mikkelsdatter Auset Singstad (July 10, 1843 – April 30, 1947).

In 1898, Singstad attended grammar school in Ålesund. Later, his sister Marie, a midwife, encouraged Singstad to further his education. He studied in Trondheim at the Trondheim Technical School from 1901 to 1905, where he was chairman of the student body.

In 1905, he emigrated to the United States. He became a U.S. citizen in 1911.

== Career ==
=== Early work ===
Ole Singstad first worked for the Central Railroad of New Jersey. In 1907, he moved to Norfolk, Virginia, where he worked on railroads and bridges for the Virginian Railway. He returned to New York City and worked at the Hudson and Manhattan Railroad, designing tunnels under the Hudson River in 1909–1910, and later spent seven years in charge of work on subways and rail tunnels in Manhattan, Brooklyn, and under the East River. During this time he worked with Clifford Holland for the New York Public Service Commission of the first district of New York.

In 1917–1918, Singstad worked at the Chile Exploration Company, and in 1918–1919, he worked with Barclay, Parsons, and Klapp (now WSP USA, formerly Parsons Brinckerhoff), where he was in charge of designing a rapid-transit system for Philadelphia, and made preliminary designs for a vehicular tunnel under the Delaware River.

=== New York City tunnels ===
Singstad is widely known for work on the underwater road tunnels in New York City and for designing the ventilation system that made long underwater road tunnels possible, first used in the Holland Tunnel under the Hudson River. He began working under chief engineer Clifford Milburn Holland in 1915, and he finished directing construction of the Holland Tunnel after the death of Holland in the fall of 1924 and of Holland's successor Milton H. Freeman, who died in March 1925.

Singstad also designed the Lincoln Tunnel, the Queens–Midtown Tunnel, and the Brooklyn–Battery Tunnel, the latter two as chief engineer of the New York City Tunnel Authority. In this capacity he clashed with Robert Moses, who not just preferred bridges but also sought to consolidate power and eliminate competition in civil engineering politics:

Why did Moses try to wreck (the Tunnel Authority)? Because he couldn't take it over, that's why. He couldn't take it over so he wanted to wreck the whole damned project.

In 1946, the Tunnel Authority was taken over by the Triborough Bridge Authority, forming the Triborough Bridge and Tunnel Authority, whereupon Singstad was fired, and the incomplete Brooklyn-Battery Tunnel was finished to specifications by TBTA chief engineer Ralph Smillie, which were mostly based on Singstad's original designs. This new design leaked, and the TBTA reverted to Singstad's original design. Singstad later claimed that Smillie had caused "excessive" leakage by not using Singstad's experimental caulking design to prevent leaks. Smillie denied that the leakage was excessive and that Singstad's caulking method had been replaced because that method was actually the cause of the leak.

=== Other work ===
Singstad was instrumental in numerous underwater vehicular tunnels worldwide.

From 1930 to 1933, he designed and led construction of the Waasland tunnel under the Schelde River in Antwerp. The retreating French set explosives in the tunnel when the war began in 1940; the damage was repaired in weeks under German occupation. Later, the Germans tried again to explode the tunnel when they withdrew in 1944, and this time the tunnel was more seriously damaged. The tunnel was inundated with river water, and repairs took several years.

- He consulted on the Posey Tube, the second underwater vehicular tunnel in the United States and the oldest immersed tube vehicular tunnel in the world, which used the same ventilation system that he had designed for the Holland Tunnel.
- He consulted on the Detroit–Windsor Tunnel, the third oldest underwater vehicular tunnel, designed by fellow Norwegian-American engineer Søren Anton Thoresen, and designed the ventilation system.
- With Thoresen, he designed the Waasland tunnel under the river Scheldt in Antwerp, Belgium. On this project, Singstad designed the lining, the tunnel shield, the ventilation, and the equipment.
- He established the company Singstad and Kehart Consulting Engineers in 1945, which with 50 to 60 staff engineers engineered the final design of The Big Walker Mountain Tunnel in Virginia.
- With his firm Singstad and Baillie in New York, he designed the Baltimore Harbor Tunnel, which opened in 1957.

Singstad also designed tunnels in Argentina, Canada, Cuba, and Venezuela.

== Pioneering techniques ==
=== Ventilating the Holland Tunnel ===
Thomas Edison had contended it was impossible to ventilate a tunnel with the volume of traffic envisioned for the Holland Tunnel. At the time of its construction, underwater tunnels were a well-established part of civil engineering, but no long vehicular tunnels had been built, as all of the existing tunnels under New York City waterways carried only railroads and subways. These tubes did not have as much of a need for ventilation, since the trains that used the tubes were required to be electrically powered, and thus emitted very little pollution. On the other hand, the traffic in the Holland Tunnel consisted mostly of gasoline-driven vehicles, and ventilation was required to evacuate the carbon monoxide emissions, which would otherwise asphyxiate the drivers. There were very few tunnels at that time that were not used by rail traffic; the most notable of these non-rail tunnels, the Blackwall Tunnel and Rotherhithe Tunnel in London, did not need mechanical ventilation. However, a tunnel of the Hudson River Tunnel's length required an efficient method of ventilation, so Chief Engineer Singstad pioneered a system of ventilating the tunnel transversely (perpendicular to the tubes).

In October 1920, General George R. Dyer, the chairman of the New York Tunnel Commission, published a report in which he stated that Singstad had devised a feasible ventilation system for the Hudson River Tunnel. Working with Yale University, the University of Illinois, and the United States Bureau of Mines, Singstad built a test tunnel in the bureau's experimental mine at Bruceton, Pennsylvania, measuring over 400 feet (122 m) long, where cars were lined up with engines running. Volunteer students were supervised as they breathed the exhaust in order to confirm air flows and tolerable carbon monoxide levels by simulating different traffic conditions, including backups. The University of Illinois, which had hired the only professors of ventilation in the United States, built an experimental 300-foot-long (91 m) ventilation duct at its Urbana campus to test air flows. In October 1921, Singstad concluded that a conventional, longitudinal ventilation system would have to be pressurized to an air flow rate of 27 cubic meters per second (953 cu ft/s) along the tunnel. On the other hand, the tunnel could be adequately ventilated transversely if the compartment carrying the tube's roadway was placed in between two plenums. A lower plenum below the roadway floor could supply fresh air, and an upper plenum above the ceiling could exhaust fumes at regular intervals.

Two thousand tests were performed with the ventilation system prototype. The system was determined to be of sufficiently low cost, relative to the safety benefits, that it was ultimately integrated into the tunnel's design. By the time the tunnel was in service, the average carbon monoxide content in both tunnels was 0.69 parts per 10,000 parts of air. The highest recorded carbon monoxide level in the Holland Tunnel was 1.60 parts per 10,000, well below the permissible maximum of 4 parts per 10,000. The public and the press proclaimed air conditions were better in the tubes than in some streets of New York City; after the tunnel opened, Singstad stated that the carbon monoxide content in the tubes were half of those recorded on the streets.

=== Prefabricated tunnel sections ===
During construction of Baltimore Harbor Tunnel from 1955 to 1957, Singstad adopted a cost-saving method for the construction of the tunnel in the river mud. Previously, hydraulic shields or pressurized caissons had been used — with the constant danger of divers suffering the bends, and the necessity for constant diligence. A sunk-tube method had been earlier proposed and used by Olaf Hoff on the Detroit River tunnel and Harlem River Tunnel.

Singstad advanced Hoff's ideas and proposed first digging a large ditch in the river bottom and lowering cable-suspended pre-fabricated tunnel sections 90 metres (300 ft) in length (weighing 23,000 tons each) into the ditch from overhead barges. Interior chambers were filled with water to lower the sections, the sections then aligned, bolted together by divers, the water pumped out, and the tunnels finally covered with earth. This technique was followed in numerous later tunnel projects by other engineers, on the Chesapeake Bay Bridge–Tunnel, for example.

== Personal life ==
In 1912, Singstad married Else Johansen (June 28, 1890 – July 8, 1964). Together they had two children, Rita (May 2, 1918 – May 3, 1975) and Paul (April 25, 1925 – March 27, 1976).

Singstad returned to Norway five times in his life: first for his mother's 80th birthday in 1923, to Lensvik in 1930, and again in 1933 while working on the tunnel at the river Schelde. He missed his mother's 100th birthday in 1943 because of World War II, but he returned in 1953 and again a final time in 1967 at age 85, while he was still active in his consulting firm.

He was an avid fisherman.

Singstad died on December 8, 1969 at Doctors Hospital in New York City. At the time of his death, he lived at 1120 Fifth Avenue on the Upper East Side of Manhattan. He is buried in Brooklyn's Green-Wood Cemetery.

== Honors and awards ==
Singstad received honorary doctorates from the Stevens Institute of Technology of Hoboken, New Jersey; Polytechnic Institute of Brooklyn; St. Olaf College of Northfield, Minnesota; and the Newark College of Engineering.

Singstad served as president of the American Institute of Consulting Engineers from 1941 to 1943; he and Søren Anton Thoresen received gold medals and were decorated by King Albert I of Belgium for their work on the Waasland tunnel; a wooden statue has been erected in his honor at Lensvik Samfunnshus; and in 2008, a lecture in his honor was held at the Museum of Modern Art.

Singstad was named Officer of the Order of the Crown of Belgium in 1933, appointed Knight 1st Class of the Order of St. Olav in 1939, named an Honorary Member of the American Society of Civil Engineers in 1956, and received the Chilean Order of Merit in the grade of commander in 1959.

At age 48, Singstad received the Royal Norwegian Academy of Science Society, an award normally reserved for much older people.

== Sources ==
- Caro, Robert (1974). The Power Broker: Robert Moses and the Fall of New York. New York: Knopf. ISBN 978-0-394-48076-3.
- Bjork, Kenneth (1947). "Saga in Steel and Concrete: Norwegian Engineers in America". Norwegian-American Historical Association.
- Saga in Steel and Concrete is posted in sections at: Norway-L archives 2003-04 Norway-L archives 2003-05
