= Holland Tunnel =

Tunnel between New Jersey and New York

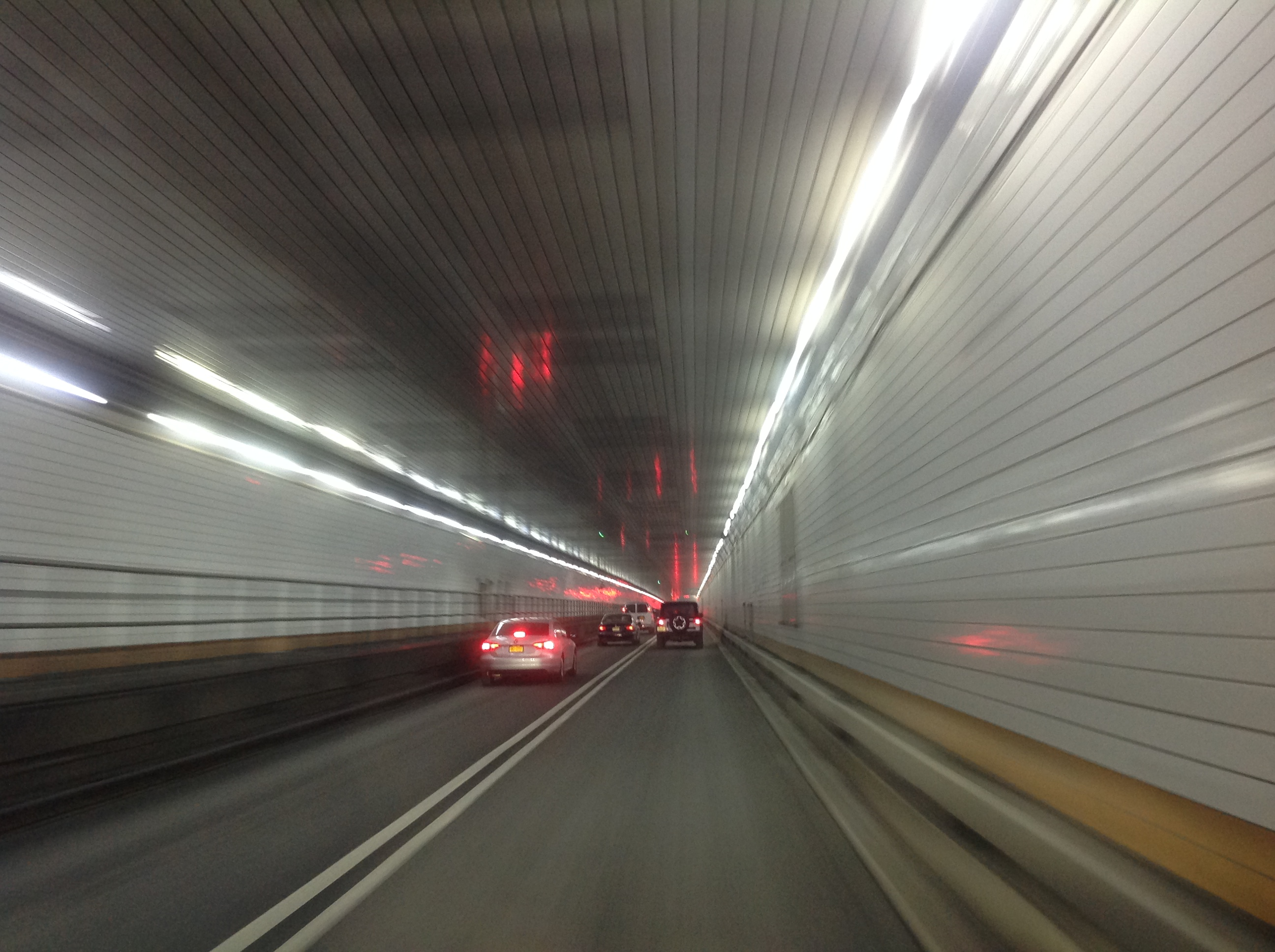
- Eastbound in the Holland Tunnel in December 2019

Overview
- Other names: Holland Vehicular Tunnel; Hudson River Vehicular Tunnel; Canal Street Tunnel
- Location: Jersey City, New Jersey – Lower Manhattan, New York
- Route: I-78 (full length); Route 139 (NJ side)
- Crosses: Hudson River

Operation
- Opened: November 13, 1927; 99 years ago
- Operator: Port Authority of New York and New Jersey
- Toll: For cars, eastbound only, as of July 12, 2026: Tolls by Mail: $23.30; E-ZPass Mid-Tier: $19.55; E-ZPass Peak: $16.79 (Weekdays: 6‍–‍10 am & 4‍–‍8 pm; Weekends: 11 am‍–‍9 pm); E-ZPass Off-peak: $14.79; Variable congestion charge incurred upon exit
- Vehicles per day: 89,792 (2016)

Technical
- Length: Westbound: 8,558 ft (2,608.5 m); Eastbound: 8,371 ft (2,551.5 m)
- No. of lanes: 4
- Operating speed: 35 mph (56 km/h)
- Tunnel clearance: 12.6 ft (3.84 m)
- Width: 20 ft (6.1 m)
- Depth below water: 93 ft (28.3 m) below MHW

Route map
- Route map of the Holland Tunnel
- Holland Tunnel
- U.S. National Register of Historic Places
- U.S. National Historic Landmark
- New York State Register of Historic Places
- Video of an eastbound trip through the tunnel
- Location: Jersey City, New Jersey – Lower Manhattan, New York
- Built: 1920
- Architect: Clifford Holland
- NRHP reference No.: 93001619
- NYSRHP No.: 06101.007028

Significant dates
- Added to NRHP: November 4, 1993
- Designated NHL: November 4, 1993
- Designated NYSRHP: November 4, 1993

The Holland Tunnel is a vehicular tunnel under the Hudson River that connects Hudson Square and Lower Manhattan in New York City in the east to Jersey City, New Jersey, in the west. The Port Authority of New York and New Jersey operates the tunnel, which carries Interstate 78. The New Jersey side of the tunnel is the eastern terminus of New Jersey Route 139. It consists of two tubes: the eastbound tube is a toll road, while the westbound tube is toll-free. The Holland Tunnel is one of three vehicular crossings between Manhattan and New Jersey; the two others are the Lincoln Tunnel and George Washington Bridge.

The Holland Tunnel is named for Clifford Milburn Holland, its first chief engineer, who died suddenly in 1924 before its opening. It was the world's first mechanically ventilated tunnel, with a ventilation system designed by Ole Singstad, who oversaw the tunnel's completion. The tubes are cast-iron rings covered with concrete and measure 29.5 feet (9.0 m) in diameter, running parallel under the river. Each tube fits two lanes and has 12 feet 6 inches (3.81 m) of vertical clearance. At the western end of the tunnel, the westbound tube exits onto 14th Street, while the eastbound tube is accessed from Boyle Plaza on 12th Street. At the eastern end, the eastbound tube exits onto the Holland Tunnel Rotary (occupying the site of the former St. John's Park Terminal), while the westbound tube is accessed from Freeman Plaza.

Plans for a fixed vehicular crossing over the Hudson River were first drawn up in 1906. Disagreements prolonged the planning process until 1919, when a tunnel under the river was approved in lieu of a bridge. Construction of the Holland Tunnel started in 1920, and it opened in 1927. At the time, it was the longest continuous underwater tunnel for vehicular traffic in the world. Plans called for connecting the tunnel to highways on both ends, but the highway on the New York side, the Lower Manhattan Expressway, was never completed. Tolls were collected in both directions until 1970, when westbound tolls were abolished. The tunnel was refurbished in the 1980s and the 2020s.

== Description ==
The Holland Tunnel is operated by the Port Authority of New York and New Jersey. It consists of a pair of parallel tubes underneath the Hudson River. The tunnel was designed by Clifford Milburn Holland, the project's chief engineer, who died in October 1924, before it was completed. He was succeeded by Milton Harvey Freeman, who died less than a year after Holland did. Ole Singstad then oversaw the completion of the tunnel. The tunnel was designated a National Historic Civil and Mechanical Engineering Landmark in 1982 and a National Historic Landmark in 1993. Emergency services at the Holland Tunnel are provided by the Port Authority Police Department, who are stationed at the Port Authority's crossings.

=== Tubes ===
==== Materials and dimensions ====
Each tube has a 29.5-foot (9.0 m) diameter, and the two tubes run 15 feet (4.6 m) apart under the Hudson River. Each tube's exterior consists of a series of cast iron rings, each made of 14 curved steel pieces, each 6 feet (1.8 m) long. A 19-inch-thick (48 cm) layer of concrete covers the steel rings. Each tube provides a 20-foot (6.1 m) roadway with two lanes and 12 feet 6 inches (3.81 m) of vertical clearance. The north tube is 8,558 feet (2,608 m) between portals, while the south tube is slightly shorter, at 8,371 feet (2,551 m). If each tube's immediate approach roads are included, the north tube is 9,210 feet (2,807 m) long and the south tube 9,275 feet (2,827 m) long. Most vehicles carrying hazmats, trucks with more than three axles, and vehicles towing trailers cannot use the tunnel. Vehicles entering the tunnel must be 8 feet (2.4 m) wide or less.

Both tubes' underwater sections are 5,410 feet (1,650 m) long and are situated in the silt beneath the river. The lowest point of the roadways is about 93 feet (28.3 m) below mean high water. The lowest point of the tunnel ceiling is about 72 feet (21.9 m) below mean high water. The tubes descend at a maximum grade of 4.06% and ascend at a grade of up to 3.8%. The tubes stretch an additional 1,000 feet (300 m) from the eastern shoreline to the New York portals, and 500 feet (150 m) from the western shoreline to the New Jersey portals. These sections of the tunnel are more rectangular in shape, since they were built as open cuts that were later covered over. The walls and ceiling are furnished with glazed ceramic tiles, which were originally engineered to minimize staining. Most of the tiles are white, but each tube has a two-tile-high band of yellow-orange tiles at the bottom and a two-tile-high band of blue tiles at the top.

The northern tube, which carries westbound traffic, originates at Broome Street in Lower Manhattan between Varick Street and Hudson Street. It continues to 14th Street east of Marin Boulevard in Jersey City. The southern tube, designed for eastbound traffic, originates at 12th Street east of Marin Boulevard, and surfaces at the Holland Tunnel Rotary in Manhattan. The entrance and exit ramps to and from each portal are lined with granite and are 30 feet (9.1 m) wide. Although the two tubes' underwater sections are parallel and adjacent to each other, the tubes' portals on either side are located two blocks apart in order to reduce congestion on each side.

The Holland Tunnel's tubes initially contained a road surface made of Belgian blocks and concrete. It was replaced with asphalt in 1955. Each tube contains a catwalk on its left (inner) side, raised 4 feet (1.2 m) above the roadway. Five emergency-exit cross-passages connect the two tubes' inner catwalks. When the Holland Tunnel opened, the catwalk was equipped with police booths and a telephone system, stationed at intervals of 250 feet (76 m).

==== Traffic ====
The volume of traffic going through the Holland Tunnel has remained steady despite tight restrictions on eastbound traffic in response to the September 11 attacks, including a ban on commercial traffic entering New York City put in place after an August 2004 threat. Aside from a sharp decline immediately following the September 11 attacks, the number of vehicles using the Holland Tunnel in either direction daily steadily declined from a peak of 103,020 daily vehicles in 1999 to 89,792 vehicles in 2016. As of 2017, the eastbound direction of the Holland Tunnel was used by 14,871,543 vehicles annually.

==== Ventilation ====
The Holland Tunnel was the first mechanically ventilated underwater vehicular tunnel in the world. It contains a system of vents that run transverse, or perpendicular, to the tubes. Each side of the Hudson River has two ventilation shaft buildings: one on land, and one in the river approximately 1,000 feet (300 m) from the respective shoreline. All of the ventilation buildings have buff brick facades with steel and reinforced-concrete frames.

The shafts within the river rise 107 feet (33 m) above mean high water. Their supporting piers descend 45 feet (14 m), of which 40 feet (12 m) are underwater and 5 feet (1.5 m) are embedded in the riverbed. The river shafts double as emergency exits by way of shipping piers that connected each ventilation shaft to the shoreline. The New York Land Ventilation Tower, a five-story building with a trapezoidal footprint, is 122 feet (37 m) tall. The New Jersey Land Ventilation Tower is a four-story, 84-foot (26 m) building with a rectangular perimeter.

The four ventilation towers contain a combined 84 fans. Of these, 42 are intake fans with varying capacities from 84,000 to 218,000 cubic feet (2,400 to 6,200 m^{3}) per minute. The other 42 are exhaust fans, which can blow between 87,500 and 227,000 cubic feet (2,480 and 6,430 m^{3}) per minute. Exhaust ducts are located at the corners of the ventilation towers, while supply ducts are in the central portion. Compartments housing exhaust fans are positioned near the corners under the exhaust stacks, with the central portions of the fan floors free for intake fans, and the central section of each outer wall for air intakes. At the time of the tunnel's construction, two-thirds of the 84 fans were being used regularly, while the other fans were reserved for emergency use. The fans blow fresh air into ducts, which provide air intake to the tunnel via openings at the tubes' curbside. The ceiling contains slits, which are used to exhaust air. The fans can replace all of the air inside the tunnel every 90 seconds. A forced ventilation system is essential because of the poisonous carbon monoxide component of automobile exhaust, which constituted a far greater percentage of exhaust gases before catalytic converters became prevalent.

=== Approach plazas ===
==== Boyle Plaza ====
The approach to the Holland Tunnel in Jersey City begins where the lower level of NJ Route 139 and the Newark Bay Extension merge. On May 6, 1936, the section of what became Route 139/I-78 between Jersey Avenue and Marin Boulevard was named in memory of John F. Boyle, the former interstate tunnel commissioner. Despite being part of the Interstate Highway System, I-78 and Route 139 run concurrently along 12th and 14th Streets to reach the Holland Tunnel. Westbound traffic uses 14th Street while eastbound traffic uses 12th Street. The plaza was restored and landscaped by the Jersey City government in 1982.

There is a nine-lane toll plaza for eastbound traffic only at the eastern end of 12th Street, just west of the tunnel portal. The original toll plaza had eight lanes; it was renovated in 1953–1954, and the current nine-lane tollbooth was constructed in 1988.

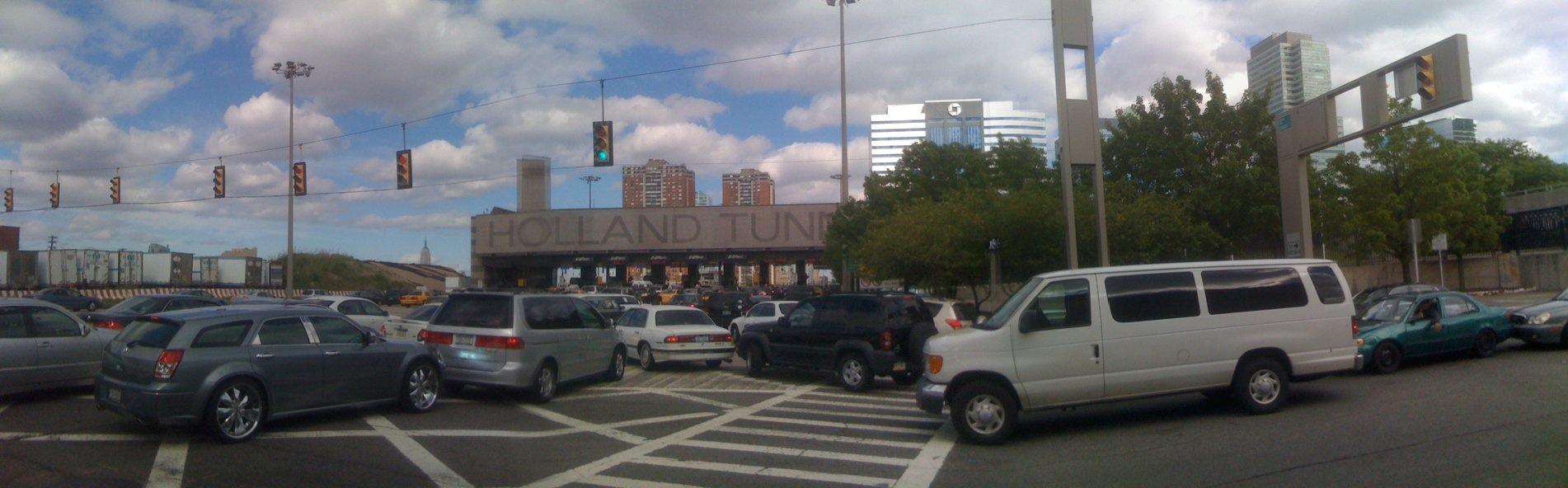
The Jersey City entrance during rush hour in May 2010

==== Holland Tunnel Rotary ====
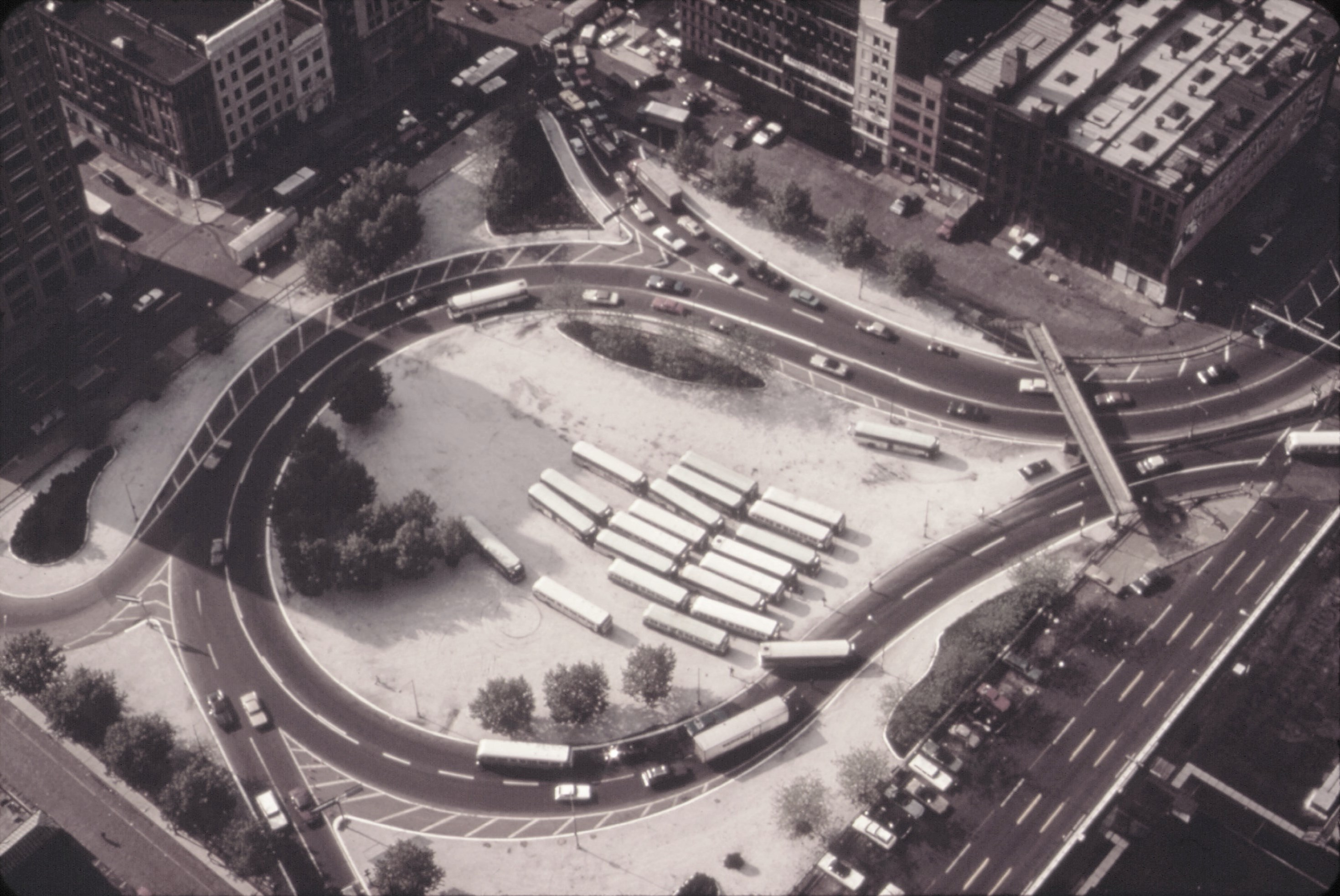
A 1973 aerial view of the rotary with parked buses. A fifth exit was added in 2004.

Soon after construction of the tunnel, and amid rising vehicular traffic in the area, a railroad freight depot, St. John's Park Terminal, was abandoned and later demolished. The depot was located on the city block bounded by Laight, Varick, Beach, and Hudson Streets. The depot's site was used as a storage yard until the 1960s when it became a circular roadway for traffic exiting the eastbound tube in Manhattan.

The plaza originally had four exits. It was renovated in the early 2000s with landscaping by Studio V Architecture and Ives Architecture Studio. A fifth exit was added in 2004.

==== Freeman Plaza ====
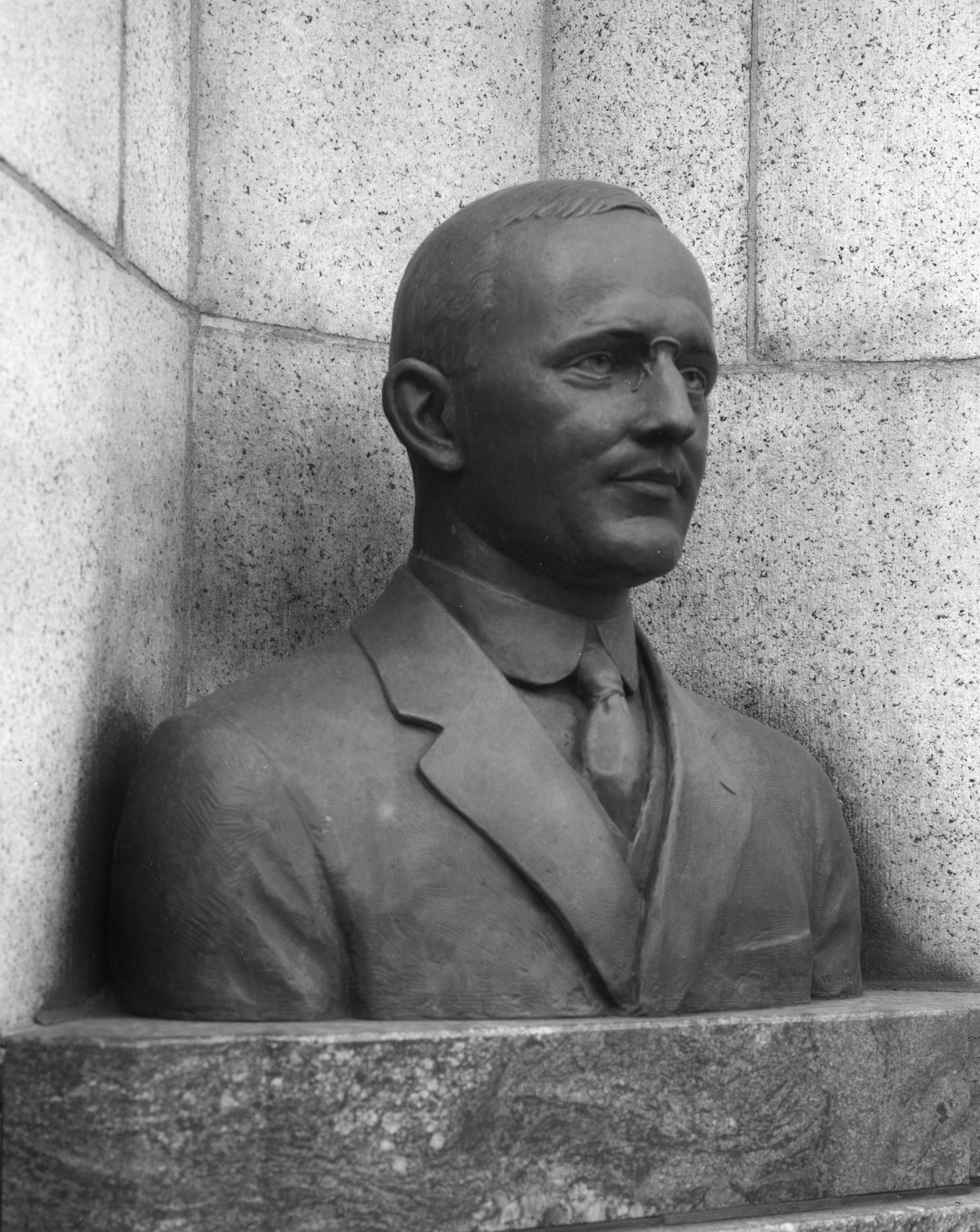
A bust of Clifford Milburn Holland, the tunnel's first chief engineer, at the Holland Tunnel's entrance

Originally used as the toll plazas for New Jersey-bound traffic, the small triangular patches of land at the mouth of the westbound tube entrance are referred to as Freeman Plaza or Freeman Square. The plaza is named after Milton Freeman, the engineer who took over the Holland Tunnel project after the death of Clifford Milburn Holland. The Freeman Plaza received its name just before the tunnel opened in 1927. The toll plaza was removed circa 1971 when the Port Authority stopped collecting tolls for New Jersey-bound drivers, and the square was later fenced off by the Port Authority. The small maintenance buildings for toll collectors were removed around 1982 or 1983. A bust of Holland sits outside the entrance to the westbound tube in Freeman Plaza.

A business improvement district for the area, the Hudson Square Connection, was founded in 2009 with the goal of repurposing the square for pedestrian use. Hudson Square Connection and the Port Authority collaborated to create a five-year, $27 million master plan for Freeman Plaza. In 2013, Freeman Plaza West was opened to the public. Bounded by Hudson, Broome, and Watts Streets, it features umbrellas, bistro tables and chairs, and tree plantings.

In 2014, Freeman Plaza East and Freeman Plaza North were opened on Varick and Broome Streets, respectively. The plazas contained chaise longues, bistro tables, and umbrellas. In 2016, the Hudson Square Connection added solar powered charging stations to both plazas, and introduced a summer lunchtime music series, called live@lunch. A statue by the artist Isamu Noguchi was also installed within the plaza. To the south of Freeman Plaza, between Varick, Watts, and Canal Streets is One Hudson Square, a New York City designated landmark in 2013.

== History ==
=== Need for vehicular tunnel ===
Until the first decade of the 20th century, passage across the lower Hudson River was possible only by ferry. The first tunnels to be bored below the Hudson River were for railroad use. The Hudson & Manhattan Railroad, now PATH, constructed two pairs of tubes to link the major railroad terminals in New Jersey with Manhattan Island: the Uptown Hudson Tubes, which opened in 1908, and the Downtown Hudson Tubes, which opened in 1909. The Pennsylvania Railroad's twin North River Tunnels, constructed to serve the new Pennsylvania Station, opened in 1910. The construction of these three tunnels proved that tunneling under the Hudson River was feasible. However, although train traffic was allowed to use the tunnel crossings, automotive traffic still had to be transported via ferry.

At the same time, freight traffic in the Port of New York and New Jersey was mostly carried on boats, but traffic had grown to such a point that the boats were at full capacity, and some freight started going to other ports in the United States. To alleviate this, officials proposed building a freight railroad tunnel, but this was blocked by the organized syndicates that held influence over much of the port's freight operations. The public learned of the excessive traffic loads on existing boat routes, as well as the limited capacity of the H&M and North River Tunnels, when the surface of the Hudson River froze in winter 1917, and again when Pennsylvania Railroad workers went on strike in winter 1918. One engineer suggested that three freight railroad tunnels would be cheaper to construct than one bridge.

=== Planning ===
==== Initial plans ====
In 1906, the New York and New Jersey Interstate Bridge Commission, a consortium of three groups, was formed to consider the need for a crossing across the Hudson River between New York City and New Jersey. That year, three railroads asked the commission to consider building a railroad bridge over the river. In 1908, the commission considered building three bridges across the Hudson River at 57th, 110th, and 179th Streets in Manhattan. The reasoning was that bridges would be cheaper than tunnels. These three locations were considered to be the only suitable locations for suspension bridges; other sites were rejected on the grounds of aesthetics, geography, or traffic flows. John Vipond Davies, one of the partners for the consulting firm Jacobs and Davies (which had constructed the Uptown Hudson Tubes), wanted to build a vehicular tunnel between Canal Street, Manhattan, and 13th Street, Jersey City. This proposal would compete with the six-lane suspension bridge at 57th Street. Some plans provided for the construction of both the bridge and the tunnel. The ferries could not accommodate all of the 19,600 vehicles per day, as of 1913, that traveled between New York and New Jersey. The Bridge Commission hosted several meetings to tell truck drivers about the details of both the 57th Street Bridge and Canal Street Tunnel plans.

The United States Department of War brought up concerns about the 57th Street bridge plans: the span would need to be at least 200 feet (61 m) above the mean high water to avoid interfering with shipping. By comparison, the tunnel would be 95 feet (29 m) below mean water level. The Interstate Bridge Commission, which had been renamed the New York State Bridge and Tunnel Commission in April 1913, published a report that same month, stating that the Canal Street tunnel would cost $11 million while the 57th Street bridge would cost $42 million. In October 1913, Jacobs and Davies stated that a pair of tunnels, with each tube carrying traffic in one direction, would cost only $11 million, while a bridge might cost over $50 million. The low elevation and deep bedrock of Lower Manhattan was more conducive to a tunnel than to a bridge. By the end of that year, the consulting engineers for both the 57th Street Bridge and the Canal Street Tunnel had submitted their plans to the Bridge and Tunnel Commission. New York City merchants mainly advocated for the tunnel plan, while New Jerseyans and New York automobile drivers mostly supported the bridge plan. Meanwhile, the New York State Bridge and Tunnel Commission indicated that it favored the Canal Street tunnel plan. On the other hand, the 57th Street bridge plan remained largely forgotten.

The Public Service Commission of New Jersey published a report in April 1917, stating that the construction of a Hudson River vehicle tunnel from Lower Manhattan to Jersey City was feasible. That June, following this report, Walter E. Edge, then Governor of New Jersey, convened the Hudson River Bridge and Tunnel Commission of New Jersey, which would work with the New York Bridge and Tunnel Commission to construct the new tunnel. In March 1918, a report was sent to the New York State Legislature, advocating for the construction of the tunnel as soon as possible. That year, six million dollars in funding for the Hudson River Tunnel was proposed in two bills presented to subcommittees of the United States Senate and House of Representatives. The bill was voted down by the Interstate Commerce Committee before it could be presented to the full Senate.

==== Plans approved ====
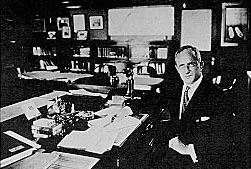
Clifford Milburn Holland, the tunnel's initial engineer and for whom it is named, in 1919

The original plans for the Hudson River tunnel were for twin two-lane tubes, with each tube carrying traffic in a single direction. A request for proposals for the tunnel was announced in 1918, and eleven such requests were considered. One of these proposals, authored by engineer George Goethals, was for a bi-level tube. A modification of Jacobs and Davies' 1913 plan, the Goethals proposal specified that each level would carry three lanes of traffic, and that traffic on each level would run in a different direction. Goethals stated that his plan would cost $12 million and could be completed in three years. Subsequently, John F. O'Rourke offered to build the tunnel for $11.5 million. Goethals cited the area's freight traffic as one of the reasons for constructing the tube. His proposal would use a 42-foot (13 m) diameter shield to dig the tunnel. This large tunnel size was seen as a potential problem, since there were differences in the air pressure at the top and the bottom of each tunnel, and that air pressure difference increased with a larger tunnel diameter. Five engineers were assigned to examine the feasibility of Goethals's design. In July 1919, President Woodrow Wilson ratified a Congressional joint resolution for a trans-Hudson tunnel, and Clifford Milburn Holland was named the project's chief engineer. Holland stated that, based on the construction methods used for both pair of tubes, including the downtown pair, it should be relatively easy to dig through the mud on the bottom of the Hudson River, and that construction should be completed within two years.

The federal government refused to finance the project, even in part, and so it fell to the states to raise the funds. In June 1919, U.S. Senator and former New Jersey governor Edge presented another iteration of the Hudson River Tunnel bill to the U.S. Senate, where it was approved. The New York and New Jersey governments signed a contract in September 1919, in which the states agreed to build, operate, and maintain the tunnel in partnership. The contract was signed by the states' respective tunnel commissions in January 1920.

Under Holland's plan, each of the two tubes would have an outside diameter of 29 feet (8.8 m) including exterior linings, and the tubes would contain two-lane roadways with a total width of 20 feet (6.1 m). One lane would be for slower traffic, and the other would be for faster traffic. This contrasted with Goethals's plan, wherein the three roadways would have had a total width of 24.5 feet (7.5 m), only a few feet wider than Holland's two-lane roadways. Additionally, according to Holland, the 42-foot-wide tube would require the excavation of more dirt than both 29-foot tubes combined: two circles with 29-foot diameters would have a combined area of 5,282.2 square feet (490.73 m^{2}), while a circle with a 42-foot diameter would have an area of 5,541.8 square feet (514.85 m^{2}). The more northerly westbound tube would begin at Broome and Varick Streets on the Manhattan side and end at the now-demolished intersection of 14th and Provost Streets on the New Jersey side. The more southerly eastbound tube would begin at the still-intact intersection of 12th and Provost Streets in Jersey City, and end at the south side of Canal Street near Varick Street. By way of comparison, Goethals's plan would have combined the entrance and exit plazas on each side. The Motor Truck Association of America unsuccessfully advocated for three lanes in each tube.

Even though Goethals's method of digging had not been tested, he refused to concede to Holland's proposal, and demanded to see evidence that Holland's proposal would work. The New York and New Jersey Tunnel Commission subsequently rejected Goethals's plan in favor of a twin-tube proposal that Holland had devised, which was valued at around $28.7 million. When Goethals asked why, the commission responded that Goethals's proposal had never been tested; that it was too expensive; and that the tunnel plans had many engineering weaknesses that could cause the tube to flood. Additionally, while a tube with three lanes in each direction would be able to handle more traffic than a tube with two lanes, projections showed that traffic on the tunnel's approach roads could barely handle the amount of traffic going to and from the two-lane tubes, and that widening the approach roads on each side would cost millions of dollars more. The commission then voted to forbid any further consideration of Goethals's plan. Holland defended his own plan by pointing out that the roadways in Goethals's plan would not only feature narrower road lanes, but also would have ventilation ducts that were too small to ventilate the tube efficiently.

In May 1920, the New Jersey Legislature voted to approve the start of construction, overriding a veto from the New Jersey governor. The same month, the New York governor signed a similar bill that had been passed in the New York legislature. The legislature of New Jersey approved a $5 million bond issue for the tunnel in December 1920.

=== Construction ===
The first bid for constructing the Hudson River Tunnel, a contract for digging two of the tunnel's eight planned shafts, was advertised in September 1920. A groundbreaking for the Hudson River Tunnel's ventilation shaft, which marked the official start of construction on the tunnel, occurred on October 12, 1920, at Canal and Washington Streets on the Manhattan side. However, further construction of the Hudson River Tunnel was soon held up due to concerns over its ventilation system. There was also a dispute over whether the New York City government should pay for street-widening projects on the New Jersey side. Further delays arose when the New York and New Jersey tunnel commissions could not agree over which agency would award the contract to build the construction and ventilation shafts.

==== Ventilation system ====
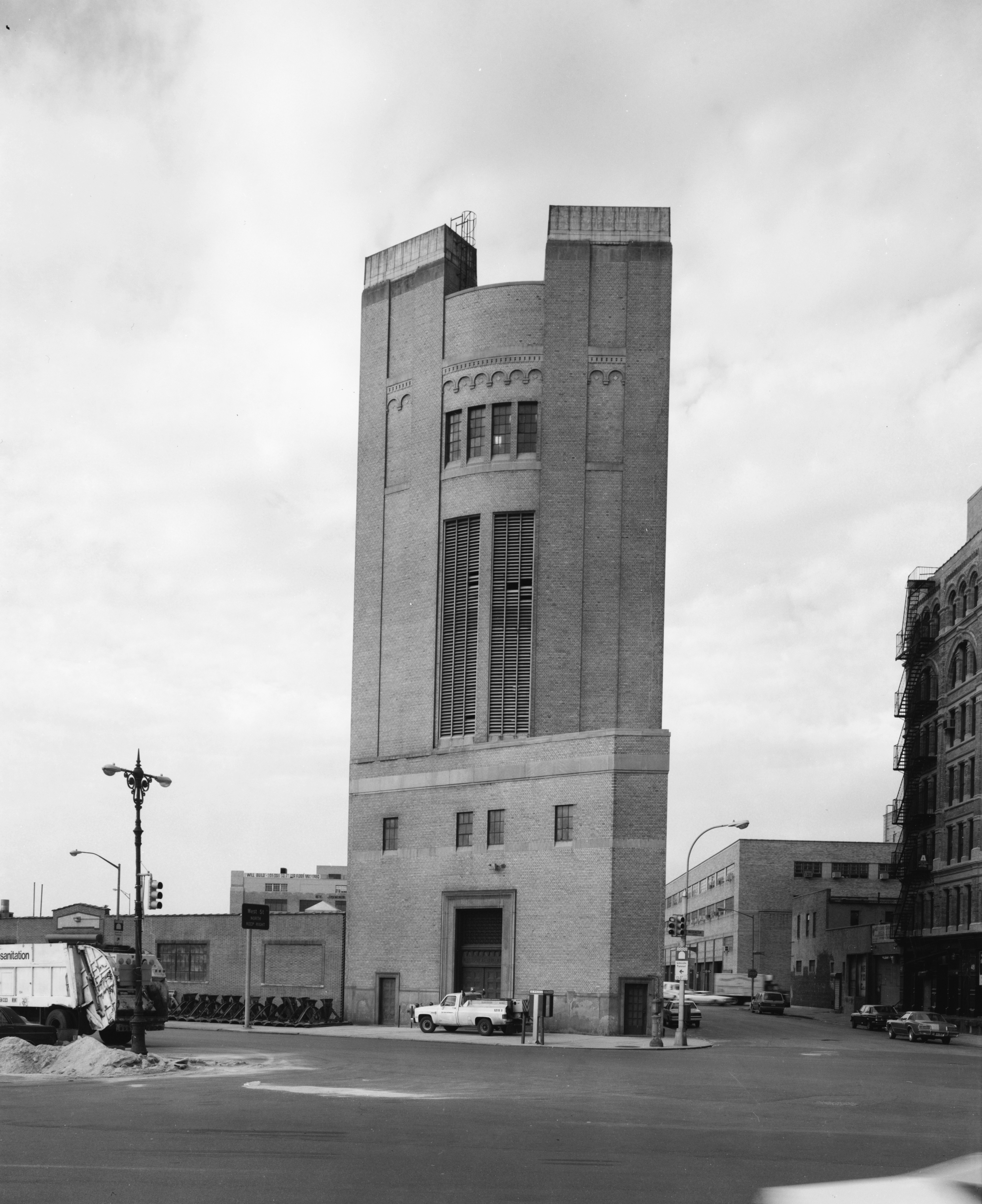
1985 shot of the tower at the New York Land Ventilation Building, one of four such towers

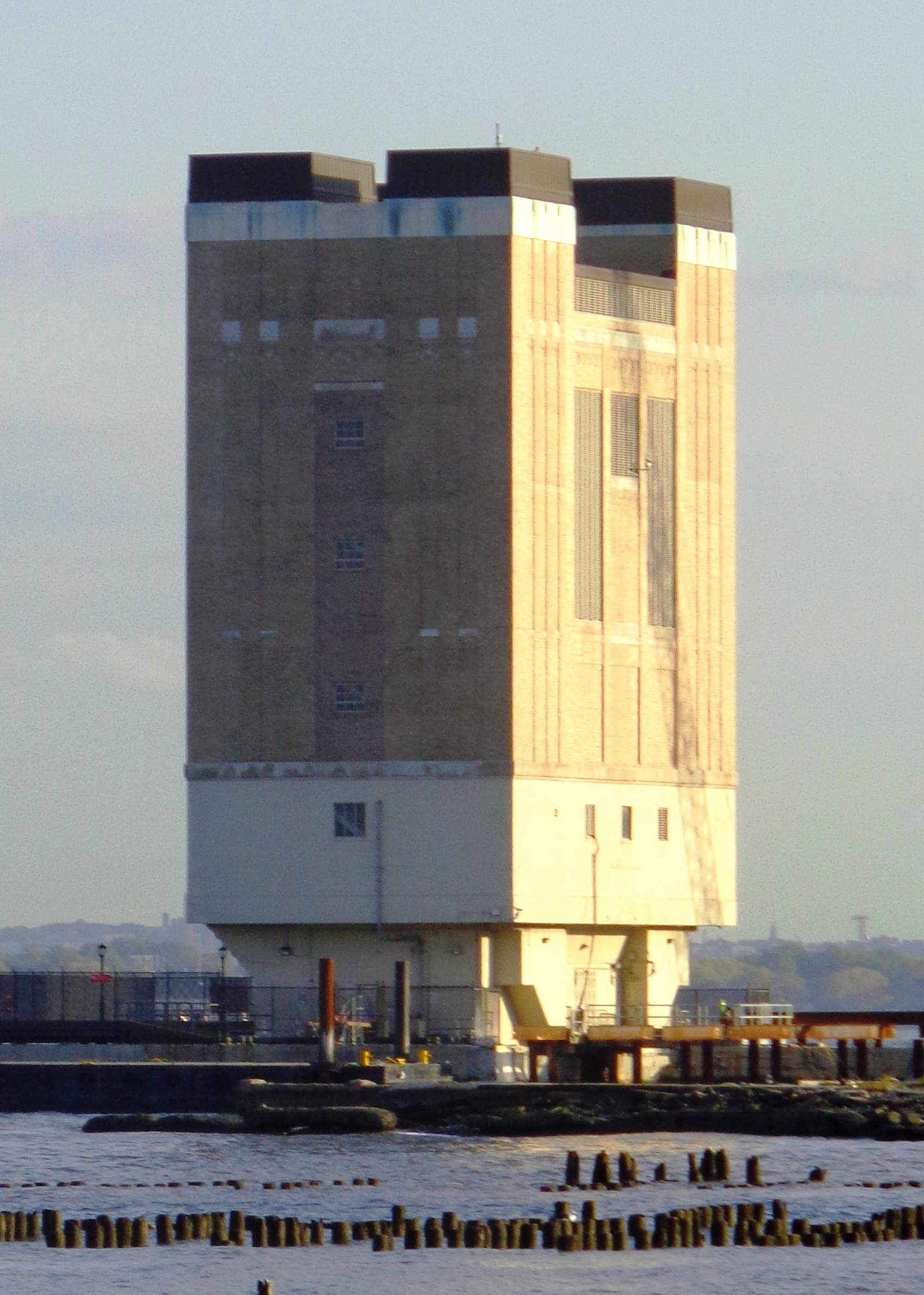
The Hudson River ventilation tower in Jersey City

The most significant design aspect of the Holland Tunnel is its ventilation system; it is served by four ventilation towers designed by Norwegian architect Erling Owre. At the time of its construction, underwater tunnels were a well-established part of civil engineering, but no long vehicular tunnels had been built, as all of the existing tunnels under New York City waterways carried only railroads and subways. These tubes did not have as much of a need for ventilation, since the trains that used the tubes were required to be electrically powered, and thus emitted very little pollution. On the other hand, the traffic in the Holland Tunnel consisted mostly of gasoline-driven vehicles, and ventilation was required to evacuate the carbon monoxide emissions, which would otherwise asphyxiate the drivers. There were very few tunnels at that time that were not used by rail traffic; the most notable of these non-rail tunnels, the Blackwall Tunnel and Rotherhithe Tunnel in London, did not need mechanical ventilation. However, a tunnel of the Hudson River Tunnel's length required an efficient method of ventilation, so Chief Engineer Singstad pioneered a system of ventilating the tunnel transversely (perpendicular to the tubes).

In October 1920, General George R. Dyer, the chairman of the New York Tunnel Commission, published a report in which he wrote that Singstad had devised a feasible ventilation system for the Hudson River Tunnel. Working with Yale University, the University of Illinois, and the United States Bureau of Mines, Singstad built a test tunnel in the bureau's experimental mine at Bruceton, Pennsylvania, measuring over 400 feet (122 m) long, where cars were lined up with engines running. Volunteer students were supervised as they breathed the exhaust in order to confirm air flows and tolerable carbon monoxide levels by simulating different traffic conditions, including backups. The University of Illinois, which had hired the only professors of ventilation in the United States, built an experimental 300-foot-long (91 m) ventilation duct at its Urbana campus to test air flows. In October 1921, Singstad concluded that a conventional, longitudinal ventilation system would have to be pressurized to an air flow rate of 27 cubic meters per second (953 cu ft/s) along the tunnel. On the other hand, the tunnel could be adequately ventilated transversely if the compartment carrying the tube's roadway was placed in between two plenums. A lower plenum below the roadway floor could supply fresh air, and an upper plenum above the ceiling could exhaust fumes at regular intervals.

Two thousand tests were performed with the ventilation system prototype. The system was determined to be of sufficiently low cost, relative to the safety benefits, that it was ultimately integrated into the tunnel's design. By the time the tunnel was in service, the average carbon monoxide content in both tunnels was 0.69 parts per 10,000 parts of air. The highest recorded carbon monoxide level in the Holland Tunnel was 1.60 parts per 10,000, well below the permissible maximum of 4 parts per 10,000. The public and the press proclaimed air conditions were better in the tubes than in some streets of New York City; after the tunnel opened, Singstad stated that the carbon monoxide content in the tubes were half of those recorded on the streets.

==== Tunnel boring ====
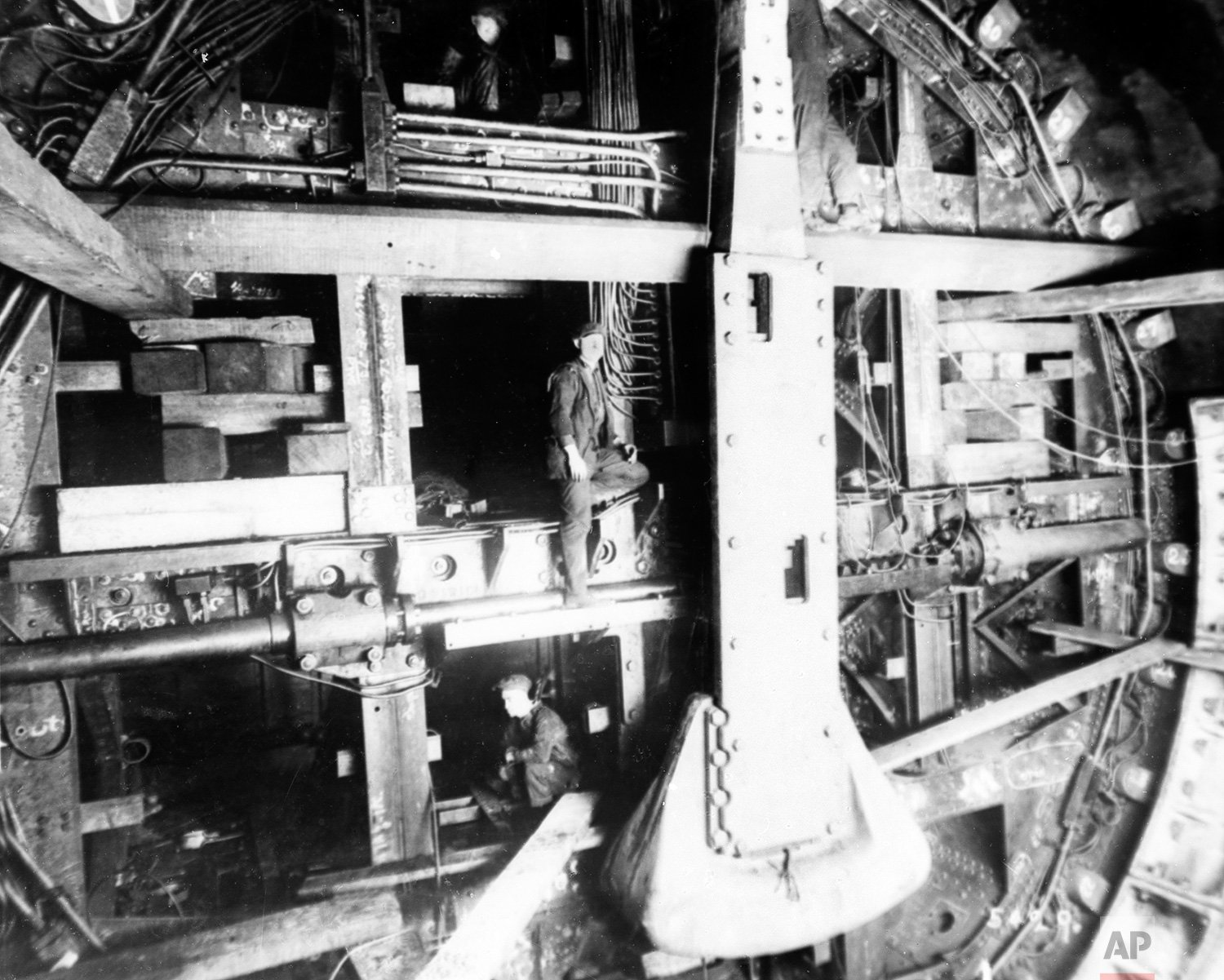
Construction of Holland Tunnel on November 25, 1922

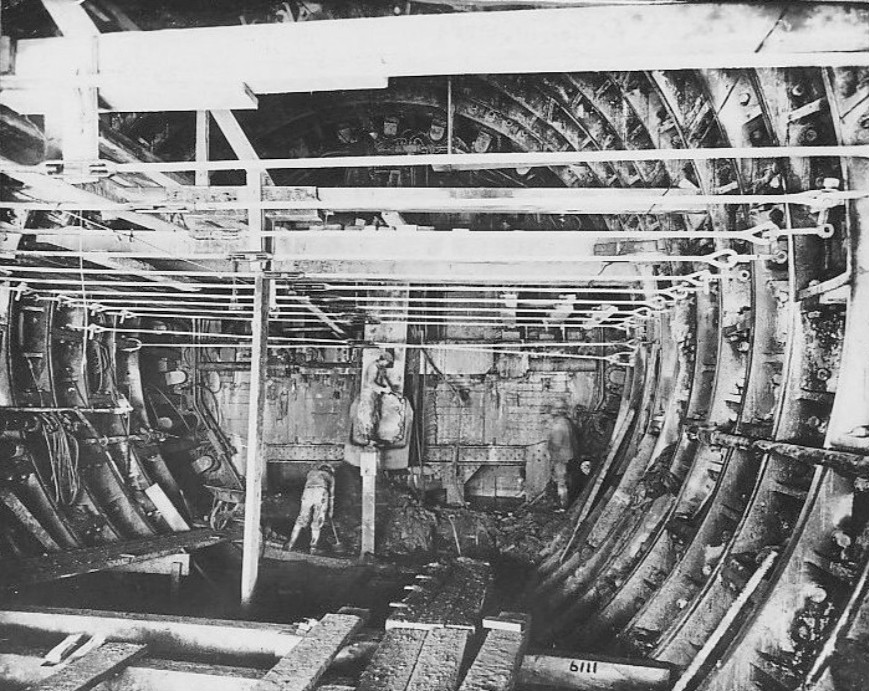
Construction on the tunnel in 1923

The ventilation system and other potential issues had been resolved by December 1921, and officials announced that the tunnel would break ground the following spring. Builders initially considered building a trench at the bottom of the Hudson River and then covering it up, but this was deemed infeasible because of the soft soil that comprised the riverbed, as well as the heavy maritime traffic that used the river. Officials started purchasing the properties in the path of the tunnel's approaches, evicting and compensating the tenants "without delay" so that construction could commence promptly. A bid to construct the tubes was advertised, and three firms responded. On March 29, 1922, the contract to dig the tubes was awarded to the lowest bidder, Booth & Flinn Ltd., for $19.3 million. The materials that were necessary to furnish the Hudson River Tunnel had already been purchased, so it was decided to start work immediately. Construction on the bores began two days later as workers broke ground for an air compressor to drive the tubes. The ceremony for the air compressor was held at the corner of Canal Street and West Side Highway on the Manhattan side. The workers who were performing the excavations, who were referred to as "sandhogs", were to dig each pair of tubes from either bank of the Hudson River, so that the two sides would eventually connect somewhere underneath the riverbed. The tunnel was to be 9,250 feet (2,820 m) long between portals, and the roadway was to descend to a maximum depth of 93 feet (28 m) below mean high water level.

The start of construction for the tubes from the New Jersey side was delayed because the Hudson River Vehicular Tunnel Commission had not yet acquired some of the land for the project. Although Jersey City officials had insisted that the Tunnel Commission widen 12th and 14th Streets in Jersey City, these officials were involved in a disagreement over sale prices with the Erie Railroad, which owned some of the land that was to be acquired for the street widening. As a result, work on the Hudson River Tunnel was delayed by one year and could not be completed before 1926 at the earliest. Work on the New Jersey side finally started on May 30, 1922, after Jersey City officials continued to refuse to cede public land for the construction of the tunnel's plazas. The Jersey City Chamber of Commerce wrote a letter that denounced this action, since the New Jersey Tunnel Commission's members on the Hudson River Tunnel Commission had not been notified of the groundbreaking until they read about it in the following day's newspapers. In mid-June, a state chancellor made permanent an injunction that banned Jersey City officials from trying to preclude construction on the Hudson River Tunnel. The Hudson River Tunnel Commission ultimately decided that Jersey City would not have its own groundbreaking celebration due to the city's various efforts at blocking the tunnel's construction. However, although Jersey City officials had been primarily accused of delaying construction, officials from both states had wanted the Tunnel Commission to widen the approach streets to the Hudson River Tunnel as part of the construction process.

For the project, six tunnel digging shields were to be delivered. These shields comprised cylinders whose diameters were wider than the tunnel bores, and these cylinders contained steel plates of various thicknesses on the face that was to be driven under the riverbed. Four of the shields would dig the Hudson River Tunnel under the river, while the remaining two shields would dig from the Hudson River west bank to the Jersey City portals. They could dig through rock at a rate of 2.5 feet (0.76 m) per day, or through mud at a daily rate of 5 to 6 feet (1.5 to 1.8 m). The air compressors would provide an air pressure of 20 to 45 pounds per square inch (140 to 310 kPa). The shovels used to dig the tunnel were provided by the Marion Power Shovel Company, while the six digging shields were built by the Merchants Shipbuilding Corporation. The air compressor was completed in September 1922, and the first shield was fitted into place in the Manhattan side's construction shaft. By this point, the shafts on the New Jersey side were being excavated, and two watertight caissons were being constructed.

The shield started boring in late October of that year after the steel plates that were necessary for the shield's operation had been delivered. The first permanent steel-rings lining the tubes were laid a short time afterward. The caissons were completed and launched into the river in December, and after the caissons were outfitted with the requisite equipment such as airlocks, tugboats dropped the caissons into place in January 1923. Officials projected that at this rate of progress, the tunnel would be finished within 36 months, by late 1926 or early 1927.

Tunnel construction required the sandhogs to spend large amounts of time in the caisson under high pressure of up to 47.5 pounds per square inch (328 kPa), which was thought to be necessary to prevent river water from entering prior to completion of the tubes. The caissons were massive metal boxes with varying dimensions, but each contained 6-foot-thick (1.8 m) walls. Sandhogs entered the tunnel through a series of airlocks, and could only remain inside of the tunnel for a designated time period. On exiting the tunnel, sandhogs had to undergo controlled decompression to avoid decompression sickness or "the bends", a condition in which nitrogen bubbles form in the blood from rapid decompression. The rate of decompression for sandhogs working on the Hudson River Tunnel was described as being "so small as to be negligible". Sandhogs underwent such decompressions 756,000 times throughout the course of construction, which resulted in 528 cases of the bends, though none were fatal. The tunnel's pressurization caused other problems, including a pressure blowout in April 1924 that flooded the tube.

Due to the geology of the Hudson River, the shields digging from the New Jersey side were mostly being driven through mud, and so could be driven at a faster rate than the shields from the New York side, which were being dug through large rock formations. When workers tried to dig through the Manhattan shoreline, they had encountered several weeks of delay due to the existence of an as-yet-unrecorded granite bulkhead on the shoreline. In September 1923, after having proceeded about 1,100 feet (340 m) from the Manhattan shoreline, workers encountered a sheet of Manhattan schist under the riverbed, forcing them to slow shield digging operations from 12.5 feet per day (3.8 m/d) to less than 1 foot per day (0.30 m/d). This outcropping was fed from a stream in Manhattan that emptied into the Hudson River. The sandhogs planned to use small explosive charges to dig through the rock shelf without damaging the shield. By December 1923, about 4,400 feet (1,300 m) of each tube's total length had been excavated, and the first of the shields had passed through the underwater shafts that had been sunk during construction. Due to these unexpected issues, the cost estimate for the tunnel was increased from $28 million to $42 million in January 1924. By March 1924, all seven of the ventilation shafts had been dug, and three of the four shields that were digging underwater had passed through their respective underwater construction shafts, with the fourth shield nearing its respective shaft.

Workers also performed tests to determine whether they could receive radio transmissions while inside the tunnel. They found that they were able to receive transmissions within much of the Hudson River Tunnel. However, a New Jersey radio station later found that there was a spot in the middle of the tunnel that had no reception.

The cost of the project increased as work progressed. In July 1923, the New York and New Jersey Vehicular Tunnel Commission had revised plans for the entrance and exit plazas on each side to accommodate an increase in traffic along Canal Street on the Manhattan side. The commission had spent $2.1 million to acquire land. Further redesigns were made in January 1924 due to a change of major components in the tunnel plan, including tunnel diameters and ventilation systems, which had increased the cost by another $14 million.

==== Nearing completion ====
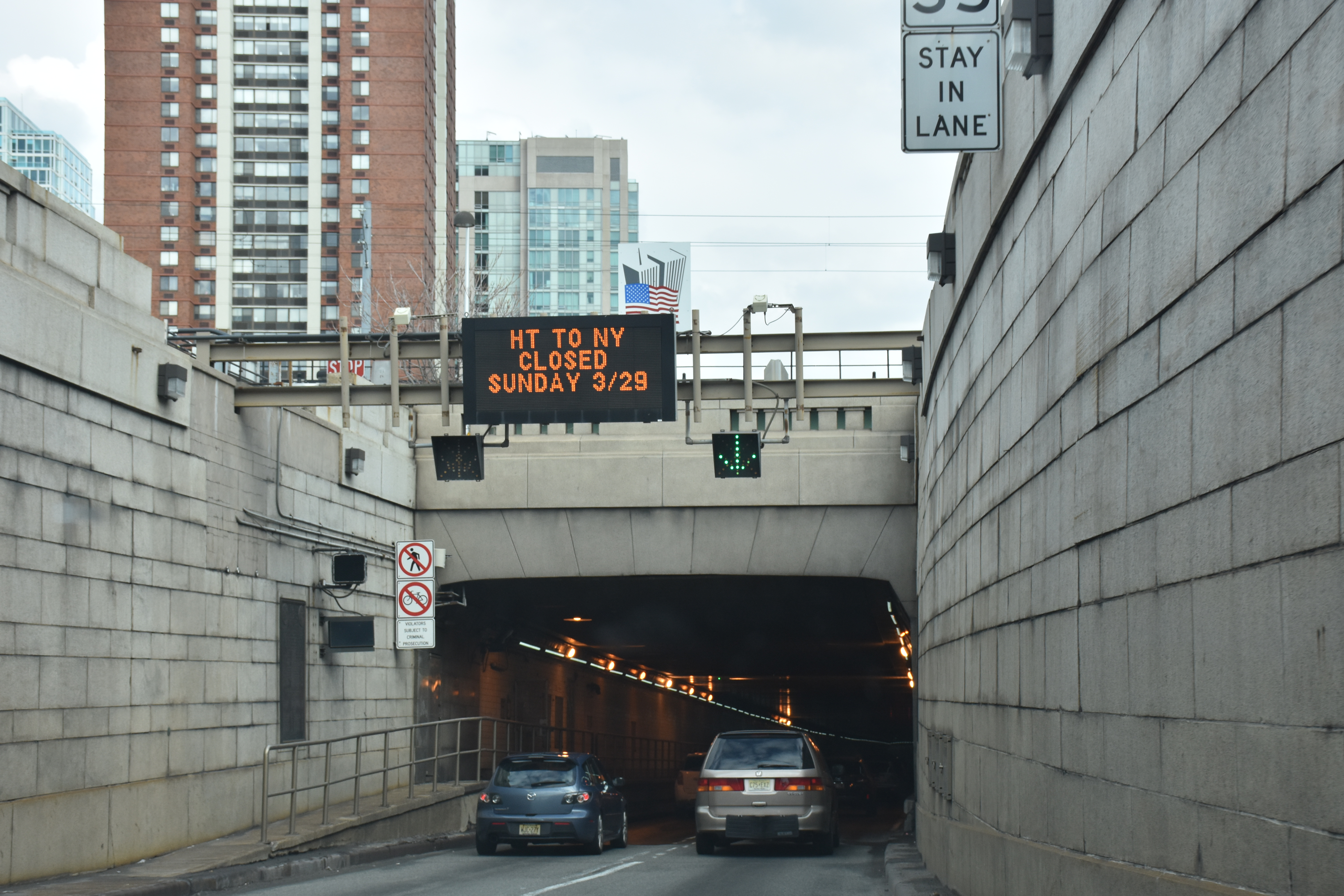
The Jersey City entrance to the tunnel in March 2015

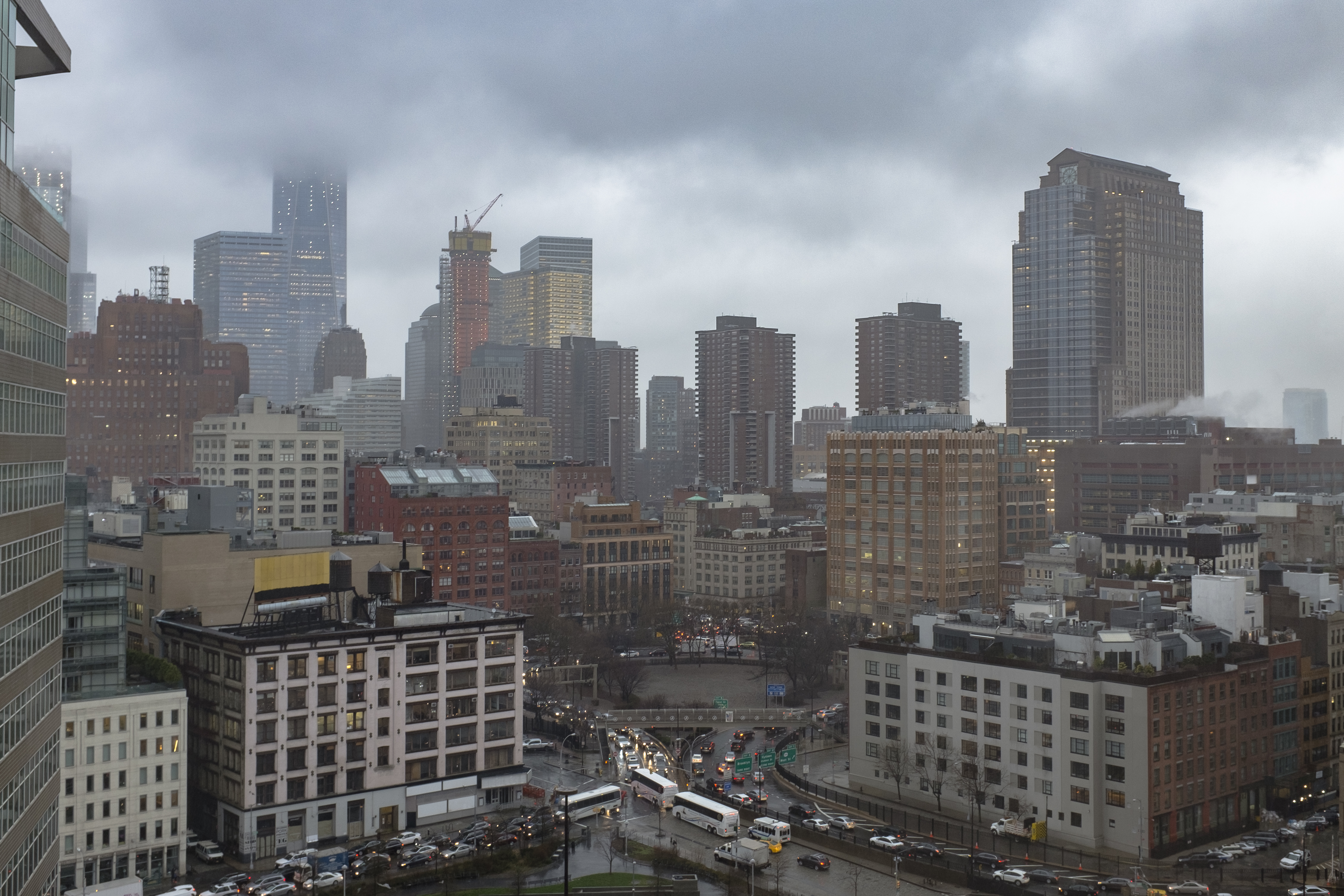
Aerial view of Lower Manhattan with cars entering the Holland Tunnel (foreground) in March 2017

The two ends of both tubes were scheduled to be connected to each other at a ceremony on October 29, 1924, in which President Calvin Coolidge would have remotely set off an explosion to connect the tunnel's two sides. However, two days before the ceremony, Holland died of a heart attack at the sanatorium in Battle Creek, Michigan, aged 41. Individuals cited in The New York Times attributed his death to the stress associated with overseeing the tunnel's construction. The ceremony was postponed out of respect for Holland's death.

The tunnel was ultimately holed through on October 29, but it was a nondescript event without any ceremony. On November 12, 1924, the Hudson River Vehicular Tunnel was renamed the Holland Tunnel by the two states' respective tunnel commissions. Holland was succeeded by Milton Harvey Freeman, who died of pneumonia in March 1925, after several months of overseeing the project. After Freeman's death, the position was occupied by Ole Singstad, who oversaw the tunnel's completion.

As part of the tunnel project, one block of Watts Street in Manhattan was widened to accommodate traffic heading toward the westbound tube. Sixth Avenue was also widened and extended between Greenwich Village and Church Street. Ten thousand people were evicted to make way for the Sixth Avenue extension. The north–south Church Street was widened and extended southward to Church Street and Trinity Place; West Side Highway was expanded and supplemented with an elevated highway; and the west-east Vestry and Laight Streets were also widened. On the New Jersey side, the Holland Tunnel was to connect a new highway (formerly the Route 1 Extension; now New Jersey Route 139), which extended westward to Newark. This included a 2,100-foot (640 m) viaduct, rising 80 feet (24 m) from 12th and 14th Streets, at the bottom of the Palisades, to the new highway, at the top of the Palisades. The New Jersey highway approach was opened in stages beginning in 1927, and most of that highway was finished in 1930.

The construction of the tunnel approach roads on the New Jersey side was delayed for months by Erie Railroad, whose Bergen Arches right-of-way ran parallel to and directly south of Route 139, in the right of way of the proposed approach roads. Although the Erie had promised to find another site for its railroad yards, it had refused to respond to the plans that the New Jersey State Highway Commission had sent them. In March 1925, the Highway Commission decided that construction on the approach roads would begin regardless of Erie's response, and so the land would be taken using eminent domain. This led to a legal disagreement between the Erie and the Highway Commission. The Erie maintained that it absolutely needed 30 feet of land along 12th Street, while the Highway Commission stated that the most direct approach to the eastbound Holland Tunnel's 12th Street portal should be made using 12th Street. The commission rejected a suggestion that it should use 13th Street, one block north, because it would cost $500,000 more and involve two perpendicular turns. In October 1926, one million dollars was allocated to the completion of the Route 139 approach.

The contracts for constructing the Holland Tunnel's ventilation systems were awarded in December 1925. Two months later, the New York-New Jersey Vehicular Tunnel Commission asked for $3.2 million more in funding. The tunnel was now expected to cost $46 million, an increase of $17 million over what was originally budgeted. The Holland Tunnel was nearly complete: in March 1926, Singstad stated that the tunnel was expected to be opened by the following February. By May 1926, the tubes had been almost completely furnished: the polished-white tile walls were in place, as were the bright lighting systems and the Belgian-block-and-concrete road surfaces. The north tube's tiles were sourced locally by the Sonzogni Brothers of Union City, New Jersey, while the south tube's tiles were sourced in equal amounts from Czechoslovakia and Germany. The tiles' surfaces were specially engineered so that they could maintain their coloring even after years of use. The lighting systems used in the Holland Tunnel were designed to allow motorists to adjust to a gradual change in lighting levels just before leaving the tubes.

The ventilation towers were the only major component of the Holland Tunnel that was not completed, but major progress had been made by the end of 1926. Ole Singstad and the two states' tunnel commissions tested the tunnel's ventilation system by releasing gas clouds in one of the tubes in February 1927. Singstad subsequently declared that the ventilation system was well equipped to ventilate the tunnel air. However, the New York Board of Trade and Transportation disagreed, stating that the system would be inadequate if there was a genuine incident within the tunnel. In April 1927, the board had conducted their own tests with two lighted candles, and a cloud of smoke had filled the entire tube before the ventilation system was able to perform a full exhaust. The Chief Surgeon of the U.S. Board of Mines supported Singstad's position that the ventilation system could sufficiently filter the tubes' air. To affirm the ventilation system's efficacy, in November 1927, the New York and New Jersey tunnel commissions burned a car within the tunnel; the ventilation system dissipated the fire within three and a half minutes.

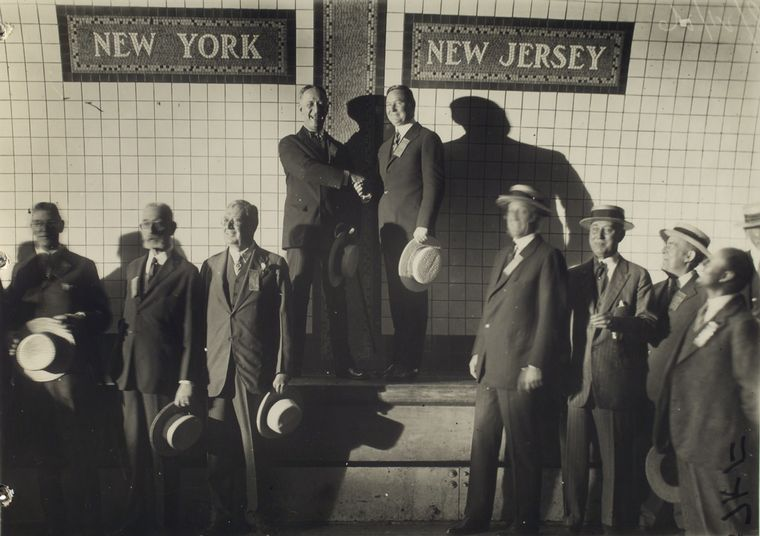
"New York met New Jersey" - Governors Al Smith and A. Harry Moore shake hands at the state border.

The governors of New York and New Jersey took ceremonial rides through the tunnel in August 1926, meeting at the tunnel's midpoint. The first unofficial drive through the entirety of the Holland Tunnel was undertaken by a group of British businessmen a year later, in August 1927. The next month, a group from the Buffalo and Niagara Frontier Port Authority Survey Commission also visited the tunnel. In October, a delegation of representatives from Detroit, Michigan, and Windsor, Ontario, toured the nearly complete Holland Tunnel to get ideas for the then-proposed Detroit–Windsor Tunnel. A reporter for The New York Times was able to make a test drive through the tunnel, noting that "there is no sudden pressure of wind upon the ear-drums" and that it would reduce the duration of crossing the Hudson River by between 15 and 22 minutes. Three hundred police officers were trained in advance of the Holland Tunnel's opening, and bus companies started receiving franchises to operate buses through the tunnel.

=== Opening ===
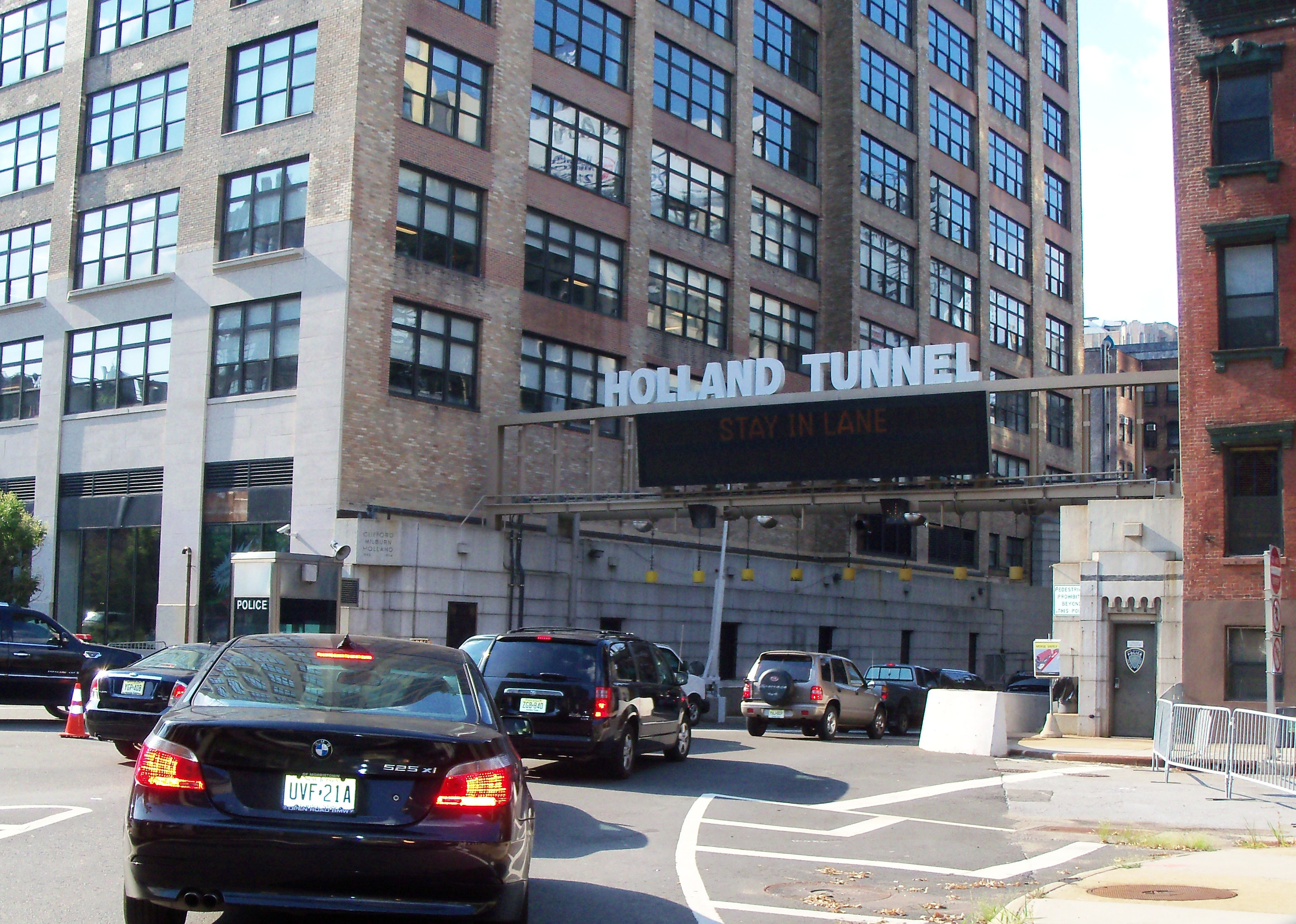
The tunnel's Lower Manhattan entrance in July 2010

The Holland Tunnel was officially opened at 4:55 p.m. EST on November 12, 1927. President Coolidge ceremonially opened the tunnel from his yacht by tapping the same telegraph key that had opened the Panama Canal in 1915, which Time magazine called "the golden lever of the Presidential telegraphic instrument." The telegraph signal electrically rang a giant brass bell at the tunnel's entrances that triggered American flags on both sides of the tunnel to separate. The tunnel's opening ceremony was broadcast on local radio stations. Approximately 20,000 people walked the entire length of the Holland Tunnel before it was closed to pedestrians at 7 p.m. The Holland Tunnel officially opened to vehicular traffic at 12:01 a.m. on November 13, the next day; over a thousand vehicles had gathered on the New Jersey side, ready to pay a toll. The first car to pay a toll was driven by the daughter of the chairman of New Jersey's Bridge and Tunnel Commission. The widows of chief engineers Holland and Freeman rode in the second vehicle that paid a toll. At the time, the Holland Tunnel was the world's longest continuous underwater vehicular tunnel, as well as the world's first tunnel designed specifically for vehicular traffic.

Each passenger car paid a 50-cent toll (worth about $9.27 in 2025). Tolls for other vehicular classes ranged from 25 cents for a motorcycle to two dollars for large trucks. Commuter bus routes, which paid a 50-cent-per-vehicle toll, began operating through the tunnel in December 1927. Truckers subsequently objected that these rates were too high, as the Holland Tunnel truck tolls were double the tolls that were charged on the trans-Hudson ferries; by contrast, the tunnel's passenger vehicle, motorcycle, and bus tolls were on par with those charged by the ferries. The toll revenues would be used to pay off the tunnel's cost (which was estimated at $48 million in 1927 dollars, $890 million in 2025 dollars). Within ten years of opening, it was expected that all construction costs would be paid off. Horsedrawn vehicles were banned from the tunnel from the start, since it was believed that horses' slow speeds would cause traffic congestion in the tubes. Pedestrian and bicycle traffic was also banned. A few months before the tunnel's opening, there were suggestions that pedestrians would be allowed to cross the tunnel if they paid a toll described as "not encouraging", but the idea was never seriously considered.

The Holland Tunnel was expected to relieve congestion on the vehicular ferries across the Hudson River, since the capacity of the tunnel was similar to that of the vehicular ferries. Upon opening, it had been estimated that up to 15 million vehicles per year could use the tunnel in both directions, equating to a maximum daily capacity of 46,000 vehicles or an hourly capacity of 3,800 vehicles. Singstad stated that increasing freight traffic across the river would result in a corresponding increase in truck traffic, which would then cause the tunnel to reach its maximum traffic capacity shortly after its opening.

The Holland Tunnel was immediately popular. On November 13, a Sunday, 52,285 vehicles passed through the tunnel on its first day of operation, more than its projected maximum capacity. The lines to enter the tunnel stretched for miles on either end, although many of these vehicles were passenger cars who were making a round trip to tour the tunnel. On November 14, the Holland Tunnel's first weekday of operation, the tunnel carried 17,726 cars. Traffic counts in the Holland Tunnel remained relatively steady until the following weekend, when over 40,000 vehicles went through the tunnel. The first holiday rush period for the Holland Tunnel occurred two weeks after the tunnel's opening, when around 30,000 motorists used the tunnel over the Thanksgiving holiday; there were no major traffic disruptions. A half-million vehicles had passed through the Holland Tunnel within three weeks, and a million had used the tubes by New Year's Day. Within the tunnel's first year, 8.5 million vehicles had used it, and the toll revenue had grossed $4.7 million in profit; it was estimated that at this rate, the Holland Tunnel's construction costs might be paid off sooner than expected.

Trans-Hudson ferries reported that their traffic counts had been halved in the two weeks since the tunnel opened, and at least one ferry route reduced service within one month of the opening. Another ferry cut its toll rates to half those of the Holland Tunnel in an effort to recover business. The Hudson & Manhattan Railroad (later PATH), which operated rapid transit services across the Hudson River through its Uptown and Downtown Hudson Tubes, also saw a decline in ridership after the Holland Tunnel opened. Even after the start of the Great Depression in 1929, when most transit in New York City saw declines, the Holland Tunnel saw an increase in traffic, as did ferry lines.

=== Early years ===
In 1930, there was a disagreement between the Hudson River Tunnel Commission and the Port of New York Authority over who would construct the Lincoln Tunnel. The tunnel was to be located further north along the Hudson River, connecting nearby Weehawken to Manhattan. The two agencies merged that April, and the expanded Port Authority of New York and New Jersey took over operations of the Holland Tunnel, a role that it maintains to this day. Real property title was not passed however. A second vehicular link between New Jersey and Manhattan, the George Washington Bridge, opened in October 1931. The Lincoln Tunnel, the third and final vehicular connection between New Jersey and Manhattan, first opened in December 1937. Within the first 25 years of the Holland Tunnel's opening, it had carried 330 million vehicles in total, but a significant portion of Holland Tunnel traffic was diverted to the Lincoln Tunnel and George Washington Bridge after the opening of the latter two crossings.

In 1945, the Port Authority approved the extension of a tunnel approach on the New Jersey side. A new viaduct for westbound traffic would connect the intersection of 14th Street and Jersey Avenue, outside the Holland Tunnel's exit portal, to Hoboken Avenue and NJ Route 139, on top of The Palisades. This would supplement an existing bidirectional viaduct, which connected Hoboken Avenue with 12th Street and currently only carries eastbound traffic. The 14th Street viaduct was first opened for vehicular use in January 1951, although the road was not complete; it was officially completed that February. The 12th and 14th Street viaducts were later also connected to the New Jersey Turnpike Extension. The first part of the extension, Newark Bay Bridge, opened between Bayonne and Newark Liberty International Airport in April 1956; the connection between Bayonne and the 12th/14th Street viaducts was completed that September, providing direct highway connection between the Holland Tunnel and Newark Airport. The NJ Turnpike Extension, as well as the Holland Tunnel and the 12th/14th Street approaches, was designated as part of I-78 in 1958.

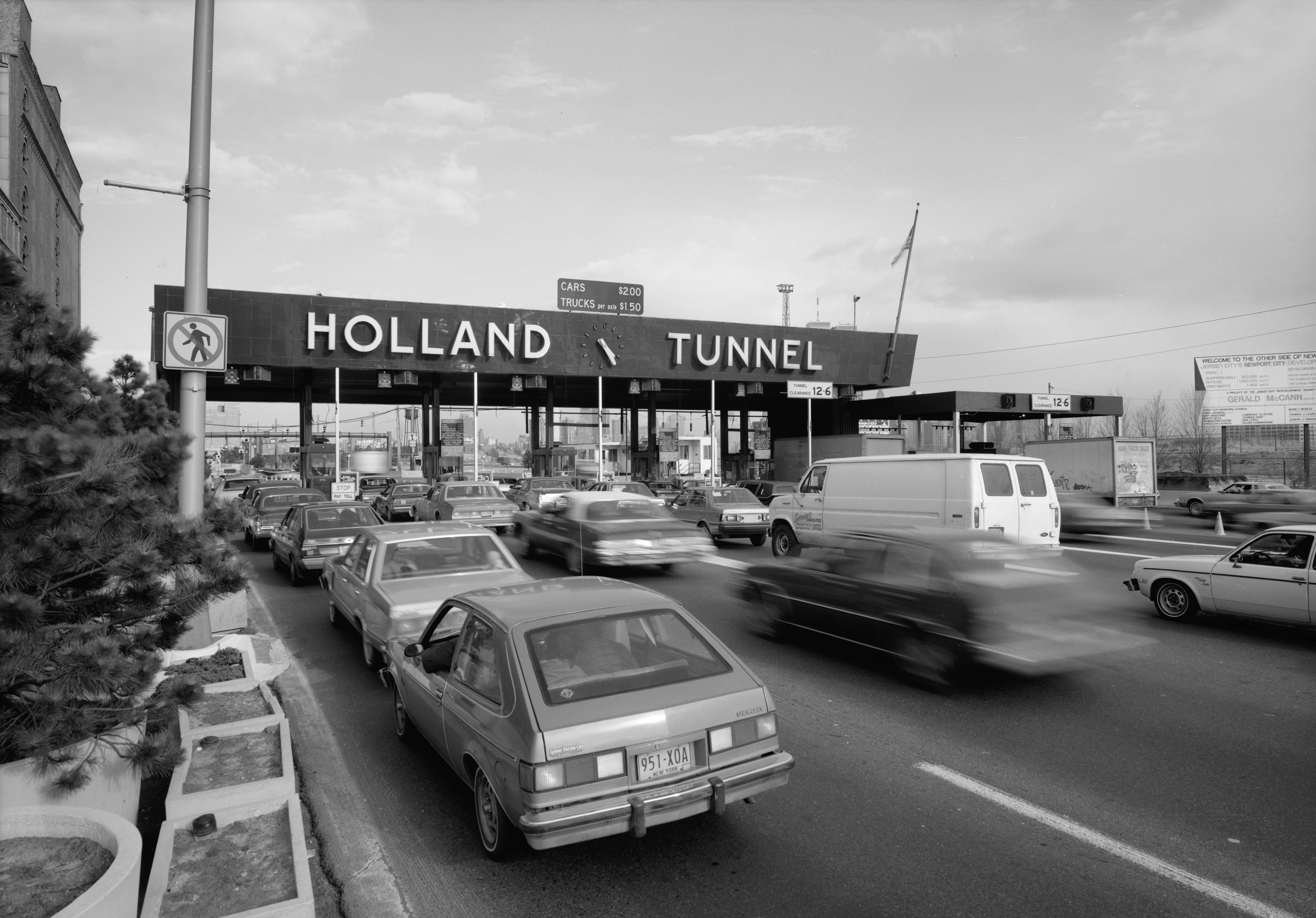
The toll plaza on the New Jersey side in 1985 just before its reconstruction

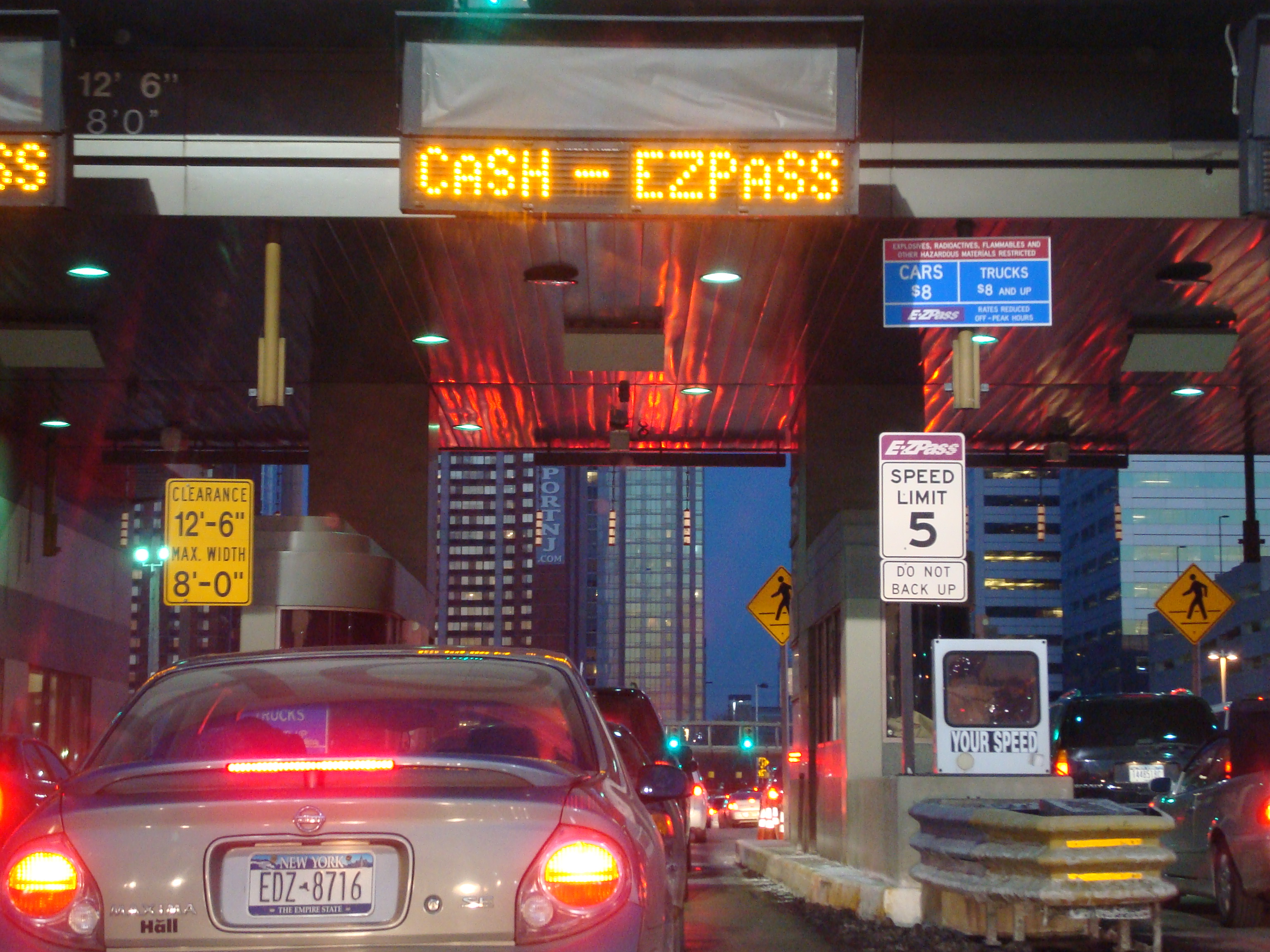
The reconstructed toll plaza with an E-ZPass-Cash lane in 2009

Starting in the 1940s, New York City officials developed plans to connect the Holland Tunnel's Manhattan end to the Lower Manhattan Expressway, a proposed elevated highway connecting to both the Williamsburg Bridge and the Manhattan Bridge to Brooklyn. This connection would be part of I-78. In 1956, Robert Moses suggested adding a third tube to the Holland Tunnel, similar to the Lincoln Tunnel's third tube, so there would be sufficient capacity for the proposed expressway traffic. The route of the Lower Manhattan Expressway was approved in 1960, but quickly became controversial due to the large number of tenants who would have to be relocated. The Lower Manhattan Expressway project was ultimately canceled in March 1971.

The Port Authority voted in 1953 to replace the original tollbooths on the New Jersey side, which did not contain canopies, with an updated plaza that contained a canopy. The next year, the Port Authority also voted to refurbish the Holland Tunnel's administration building on the New Jersey side, as well as construct a new service building. The development of a 2-foot-wide (0.61 m) one-man miniature electric car for tunnel police, to be installed on the tubes' catwalks, was announced in August 1954. The Port Authority tested the "catwalk car" along a 2,200-foot (670 m) stretch of the Holland Tunnel. After the car had passed its test, policemen could patrol the full length of the tubes using the catwalk car instead of having to walk the tubes' entire length. By use of a swivel seat the policemen could drive the car in either direction.

=== Late 20th century ===
In 1970, the Port Authority stopped collecting tolls for New Jersey-bound drivers through the Holland Tunnel, who used the westbound tube, while doubling tolls to $1 for New York City-bound drivers, who used the eastbound tube. This was done in an effort to speed up traffic, and it was the first toll increase in the tunnel's history. Although westbound drivers initially saved time by not paying tolls, the removal of westbound tolls ultimately had an adverse effect on traffic in the Holland Tunnel. In 1986, the Verrazzano–Narrows Bridge, between the New York City boroughs of Brooklyn and Staten Island, stopped collecting tolls for Brooklyn-bound drivers (who were generally headed eastbound) and doubled its tolls for Staten Island-bound drivers (who were generally headed westbound). This had the effect of increasing congestion along the New Jersey-bound tube of the Holland Tunnel, which drivers could use for free. Drivers would go through New Jersey and use the Bayonne Bridge, paying a lower toll to enter Staten Island. The amount of westbound traffic in the Holland Tunnel increased compared to eastbound traffic: by 1998, there were 50,110 daily westbound trips and 46,688 daily eastbound trips through the tunnel. Simultaneously, there was a decrease in westbound trips on the Verrazzano–Narrows Bridge compared to eastbound trips on the bridge. The Verrazzano–Narrows Bridge toll pattern also caused traffic gridlock around the Holland Tunnel, and Canal Street saw the most severe congestion because it served as the main entrance to the tunnel. Fatal accidents involving pedestrians in Lower Manhattan also increased greatly as a result. Rush-hour congestion within the Holland Tunnel has persisted for more than thirty years due to the Verrazzano–Narrows Bridge's one-way westbound toll.

A renovation of the Holland Tunnel's tiled ceilings, which were deteriorating due to water damage, started in 1983. The ceilings were replaced at a total cost of $78 million, and the south tube's ceiling was renovated first. Since the Holland Tunnel had to remain open during the renovation, 4,000 modular concrete ceiling panels were made offsite, and narrow lift trucks parked in one of the tube's two lanes installed the panels while traffic continued to move through the tube's other lane. The panels were each designed to the specifications of a certain section of tube, such that none of the ceiling panels were identical; the Port Authority stated that the ceiling-replacement project was the first one of its kind in the world. In 1988, after the ceiling renovations had been completed, work started on replacing the 8-lane tollbooth, which consisted of six lanes built in the 1950s and two additional lanes built in the 1980s. The new $54 million tollbooth contained 9 lanes and a central control center.

The Holland Tunnel was listed as a National Historic Landmark on June 27, 1993, becoming part of the National Register of Historic Places. With this designation, it became the 92nd National Historic Landmark in New York City and the sixth such landmark nationally that was a tunnel. According to M. Ann Belkov, the National Park Service superintendent for Ellis Island, the tunnel had been granted landmark status because it had been the first "mechanically ventilated underwater vehicular tunnel" in the world.

=== 21st century ===
Between 2003 and 2006, the fire protection system in both tunnels was modernized. Fire extinguishers were placed in alcoves along the tunnel walls. Although the water supply was turned off, it remained in place during the renovation.

The Holland Tunnel was closed on October 29, 2012, as Hurricane Sandy approached. The tunnel, like many other New York City tunnels, was flooded by the high storm surge. It remained closed for several days, opening for buses only on November 2 and to all traffic on November 7. In February 2018, the PANYNJ approved a $364 million project to repair flood damage from the hurricane. The agency closed the Holland Tunnel's eastbound tube during late nights, except on Saturday nights, beginning in April 2020. Though the work was initially supposed to be completed in early 2022, the work was delayed by nearly a year. The PANYNJ then announced that the westbound tube would be closed during late nights, except on Saturdays, between February 2023 and late 2025.

=== Accidents and terrorism ===
The first fatal vehicular crash in the Holland Tunnel happened in March 1932, four and a half years after it opened. One person died and two others were injured.

The 1949 Holland Tunnel fire, which started aboard a chemical truck, caused severe damage to the south tube of the tunnel. The fire resulted in 69 injuries and nearly $600,000 worth of damage to the structure. In addition, two first responders, a FDNY battalion chief and a Port Authority patrolman, died as a result of injuries sustained in fighting the fire.

Due to its status as one of the few connections between Manhattan and New Jersey, the Holland Tunnel is considered to be one of the most high-risk terrorist target sites in the United States. Other such sites in New Jersey include the Lincoln Tunnel in Weehawken, New Jersey, the PATH station at Exchange Place in Jersey City, and the Port of Newark in Elizabeth.

In 1995, Sheik Omar Abdel Rahman and nine other men were convicted of a bombing plot in which a radical Islamic group plotted to blow up five or six sites in New York City, including the Holland and Lincoln Tunnels and the George Washington Bridge.

In 2006, a plot to detonate explosives in a Hudson River tunnel was uncovered by the Federal Bureau of Investigation. It was originally reported that the Holland Tunnel was the target, but in a later update of the source, the plot was clarified to be aimed at the PATH's tubes instead of the Holland Tunnel.

==== September 11 attacks ====
Following the September 11 attacks on the World Trade Center, the Holland Tunnel remained closed to non-emergency traffic for over a month, due to the Manhattan portals' proximity to the World Trade Center site. The westbound lanes of the tunnel reopened on September 28, 2001, though eastbound travel was still restricted only to emergency vehicles. When the tunnel fully reopened on October 15, strict new regulations were enacted, and single-occupancy vehicles and trucks were banned from entering the tunnel. In March 2002, before all of the post-9/11 restrictions were lifted, a warehouse fire near the eastbound tube's New Jersey portal caused the tunnel to be closed entirely for five days; the fire continued for over a week. That April, all trucks were banned from the westbound tube, and trucks with more than three axles were also banned from the eastbound tube. Single-occupant vehicles were prohibited in the tunnel on weekday mornings between 6:00 am and 10:00 am until November 17, 2003, when the restrictions were lifted.

== Tolls ==
As of January 4, 2026, the toll going from New Jersey to New York City is $23.30 for cars and motorcycles with toll-by-plate or E-ZPasses issued by agencies outside of New York and New Jersey. New Jersey and New York–issued E-ZPass users are charged $14.79 for cars and $13.79 for motorcycles during off-peak hours, and $16.79 for cars and $15.79 for motorcycles during peak hours. E-ZPass Mid-Tier users are charged $19.55 for cars and $19.05 for motorcycles. There is no toll for passenger vehicles going from New York City to New Jersey.

Tolls were formerly collected at a tollbooth on the New Jersey side. Originally, tolls were collected in both directions. In August 1970, the toll was abolished for westbound drivers, and at the same time, eastbound drivers saw their tolls doubled. The tolls of eleven other New York City to New Jersey and Hudson River crossings along a 130-mile (210 km) stretch, from the Outerbridge Crossing in the south to the Rip Van Winkle Bridge in the north, were also changed to south- or eastbound-only at that time. E-ZPass was first made available at the Holland Tunnel in October 1997.

In March 2020, due to the COVID-19 pandemic, all-electronic tolling was temporarily placed in effect for all Port Authority crossings, including the Holland Tunnel. Open road tolling began on December 23, 2020. The tollbooths were demolished and replaced by a toll gantry in between the former tollbooths and the New Jersey entrance to the tunnel. For vehicles without E-ZPass, a picture is taken of the vehicle's license plate and a bill for the toll is mailed to its owner. For E-ZPass users, sensors detect their transponders wirelessly. The carpool discount plan was eliminated because the discount required a manual count of passengers.

=== Historical toll rates ===
Historical tolls for the Holland Tunnel (Note: This table lists the peak tolls for two-axle vehicles. Motorcycle tolls and off-peak tolls are lower, and tolls for vehicles with additional axles are higher.)
Years	Toll		Toll equivalent in 2025		Direction collected	Ref.
Years	Cash	E-ZPass	Cash	E-ZPass		
1927–1970	$0.50	—N/a	$9.27–4.15	—N/a	each direction	
1970–1975	$1.00	—N/a	$8.29–5.98	—N/a	eastbound only	
1975–1983	$1.50	—N/a	$8.97–5.86	—N/a	eastbound only	
1983–1987	$2.00	—N/a	$7.82–5.67	—N/a	eastbound only	
1987–1991	$3.00	—N/a	$8.50–7.09	—N/a	eastbound only	
1991–2001	$4.00	$4.00	$9.46–7.27	$9.46–7.27	eastbound only	
2001–2008	$6.00	$5.00	$10.91–8.97	$9.09–7.48	eastbound only	
2008–2011	$8.00	$8.00	$11.96–11.45	$11.96–11.45	eastbound only	
2011–2012	$12.00	$9.50	$17.17–16.83	$13.60–13.32	eastbound only	
2012–2014	$13.00	$10.25	$18.23–17.68	$14.37–13.94	eastbound only	
2014–2015	$14.00	$11.75	$19.04–19.02	$16.82–15.96	eastbound only	
2015–2020	$15.00	$12.50	$20.37–18.66	$16.77–15.55	eastbound only	
2020–2023	$16.00	$13.75	$19.90–17.60	$17.11–14.53	eastbound only	
2023–2024	$17.00	$14.75	$17.96–17.45	$15.59–15.14	eastbound only	
2024–2025	$17.63	$15.38	$17.63	$15.38	eastbound only	
January–July 2025	$18.31	$16.06	$18.31	$16.06	eastbound only	
July 2025 – January 2026	$22.38	$16.06	$22.38	$16.06	eastbound only	
Since January 2026	$23.30	$16.79	$23.30	$16.79	eastbound only	

=== Congestion toll ===
Congestion pricing in New York City was implemented in January 2025; drivers who enter Manhattan via the tunnel pay a second toll. The congestion charges are collected via E-ZPass and tolls-by-mail. The charges vary based on time of day and vehicle class, but the congestion toll is charged once per day. Drivers who use the Holland Tunnel to enter the congestion zone receive a $3.00 credit toward the congestion charge during the day, and pay a discounted toll at night.

== See also ==
- Albert Capsouto Park, adjacent to St. John's Park
- List of bridges, tunnels, and cuts in Hudson County, New Jersey
- List of fixed crossings of the Hudson River
- List of tunnels documented by the Historic American Engineering Record in New Jersey
- List of tunnels documented by the Historic American Engineering Record in New York
- List of National Historic Landmarks in New Jersey
- List of National Historic Landmarks in New York City
- Transportation in New York City
