= George R. Dyer =

American public servant and businessman

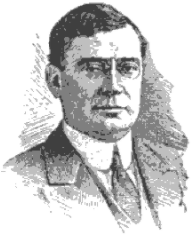
- Born: George Rathbone Dyer; June 24, 1869; Providence, Rhode Island
- Died: August 31, 1934 (aged 65); New York, New York
- Resting place: Swan Point Cemetery
- Education: St. Paul's School
- Occupation(s): Businessman, military officer, public servant
- Spouse: Grace Gurnee Scott (m. 1901; died 1926)
- Children: 3
- Parents: Elisha Dyer Jr. (father); Nancy Anthony Viall Dyer (mother)

George Rathbone Dyer (June 24, 1869 – August 31, 1934) was a scion of a prominent Rhode Island family who was a New York City businessman, military officer, and public servant, best known today for his work overseeing the New York Bridge and Tunnel Commission (which built the Holland Tunnel), and the Port Authority of New York and New Jersey.

== Early life ==
George R. Dyer was born in Providence, Rhode Island, on June 24, 1869, the son of Elisha Dyer Jr. and Nancy Anthony Viall Dyer. His grandfather Elisha Dyer had served as governor of Rhode Island, and his father was to serve as governor from 1897 to 1900. Dyer grew up in Rhode Island and attended St. Paul's School in Concord, New Hampshire. He moved to New York City, where his older brother Elisha was a banker and businessman, eventually becoming the senior partner in the brokerage firm Dyer, Hudson, & Co.

== Military career ==
Dyer enlisted in the New York National Guard in 1889, becoming a second lieutenant in 1892. In 1893 he was promoted to first lieutenant and then to captain. In 1898 he became a major and in 1899, after service in the Spanish–American War, colonel and commander of the 12th Regiment (later to become the 212th Coast Artillery).

On February 28, 1912, he was commissioned brigadier general in charge of the 87th Infantry Brigade. Dyer commanded troops on the Mexican border in 1916, stationed at McAllen, Texas. His command, the 2nd Brigade, included the 71st New York Infantry, 12th Infantry Regiment, and 7th Regiment.

During World War I Dyer was placed in command of New York state forces which replaced federal troops in the New York City region. Later he was in command of all New York state forces statewide until the return of Major General John F. O'Ryan.

Dyer was offered the command of the New York National Guard in December 1925 by governor Al Smith, but declined because he needed to devote time to his business. On his retirement in June 1933 he was commissioned major general.

== Holland Tunnel and Port Authority ==
Dyer was appointed to the commission first known as the New York and New Jersey Interstate Bridge Commission in 1907, and was its chairman from 1913 on. After 1913 it was known as the New York State Bridge and Tunnel Commission, with New Jersey having its own Hudson River Bridge and Tunnel Commission of New Jersey, first convened in 1917. The commissions decided to build a tunnel, and the most serious construction problem turned out to be ventilation; Dyer as chairman of the New York commission backed the solution advanced by engineer Ole Singstad of ventilating the tunnels transversely. After testing Singstad's method was adopted, and construction began in the spring of 1922. After many delays, the tunnel was opened November 12, 1927, and named the Holland Tunnel after its first chief engineer, Clifford Milburn Holland.

In 1930 the Holland Tunnel was transferred to the Port of New York Authority and Dyer was made a member of the Port Authority board. In 1931 the Authority completed work on both the Bayonne Bridge and George Washington Bridge. In 1933–34, Dyer served as chairman.

== Home and family ==
Dyer married Grace Gurnee Scott (1870-1926) on November 7, 1901; they had three sons: Walter Gurnee (1903-1974), Elisha (1904-1992), and George Rathbone (1907-1941). Elisha married Katherine Whitaker, daughter of Nelson Price Whitaker of the Whitaker iron family. Walter travelled in Africa as a photographer and cameraman and became a vice-president at the American Museum of Natural History. George was in the 105th Infantry Regiment, a New York National Guard unit which had been federalized, at Fort McClellan in Alabama at the time of his death.

The Dyers had a house built in 1909 in Roslyn, (Note: The house may actually have been in modern Brookville, but Brookville was not incorporated until 1931.) New York for them designed by noted architect Charles A. Platt. The gardens were designed by Ellen Biddle Shipman.

Dyer is buried in the Swan Point Cemetery in Providence, Rhode Island.

== Death and recognitions ==
Dyer was taken to Doctors Hospital in Manhattan on August 21, 1934, and had an intestinal operation a few days later; he died on August 31. His funeral was September 4; among the honorary pallbearers were Generals William N. Haskell and William Weigel and Colonels George William Burleigh and J. Mayhew Wainwright. On the day of his funeral traffic was stopped for one minute at the Holland Tunnel, George Washington Bridge, and other Port Authority bridges.

Dyer Avenue in Hell's Kitchen in New York City, a north–south thoroughfare near the Lincoln Tunnel, is named after Dyer.

On his retirement from the New York National Guard in 1933, Governor Herbert H. Lehman wrote, "For your splendid work in our armed forces and your outstanding activities and unusual accomplishment as chairman of the Holland Tunnel Commission and member of the New York Port Authority, in all of which you served without personal emolument or gain, I wish as Governor of New York to send you my thanks on behalf of all our citizens." Cardinal George Mundelein called Dyer, "A soldier who loves the service and considers his country's welfare above every other concern of his own—the type of gentleman our forefathers knew and of whom there are few in our present generation."
