= Holland Tunnel fire =

1949 vehicle fire in the United States

Coordinates: 40.72794°N 74.02407°W

- Date: May 13, 1949
- Venue: Holland Tunnel
- Location: Hudson River, New York/New Jersey, United States
- Type: Fire
- Deaths: 1 firefighter
- Injuries: 66

On the morning of Friday, May 13, 1949, a hazardous materials truck caught fire while passing through the Holland Tunnel, which travels under the Hudson River between New York City and New Jersey. One firefighter was killed and 66 civilians were injured as a result of the fire. The 1996 motion picture Daylight, starring Sylvester Stallone, was loosely based on this incident.

== Timeline ==
=== Ignition ===
At 8:30 a.m. a truck carrying eighty 55-gallon (210 L) drums of carbon disulfide entered the southern tube at the New Jersey portal. The tunnel has two tubes, the southern one for eastbound traffic and the northern one for westbound traffic. At the time, it was forbidden to carry carbon disulfide through either tube. After the truck had traveled east for approximately 2,900 feet (880 m) in heavy traffic, one of the drums broke free of its restraints, fell onto the roadway and cracked open. Vapor released from the drum was ignited when it came into contact with a hot surface, probably a brake shoe or exhaust pipe. Carbon disulfide vapor ignites when raised to a temperature of 194 °F (90 °C), so it was considered highly flammable; moreover, it could be deadly if inhaled in large amounts.

The truck came to rest in the left lane of the tunnel on a 0.25% downgrade and began to burn. Four trucks stopped on the right lane and also caught fire or were abandoned, and five more trucks caught fire slightly to the back of the carbon disulfide-carrying truck. The tunnel west of the fire became gridlocked with traffic; ultimately, 125 vehicles became stuck in the tube before it was closed.

=== Emergency response ===
Port Authority patrolmen in the tube east and west of the truck radioed in to advise of the blockage at 8:48 a.m., then to advise of the fire at 8:56 a.m. They assisted drivers to the north tube through cross-passages. Tunnel staff entered the New Jersey portal to evacuate people there and started to reverse vehicles out, while a wrecker crew drove the wrong way along the south tube and began fighting the fire at the site of the truck where it started. At the time of the fire, the tunnel was operated by the Port Authority, which had control of various other transportation facilities in the area as well. Consequently, they had a wrecker crew at the eastern end of the south tube. They initiated firefighting operations at the site of the fire with a 1.5-inch (3.8 cm) hose about five minutes after it started. However, they soon realized that they needed extra assistance due to the confined nature of the fire.

The Jersey City Fire Department (JCFD) was alerted at 9:05 a.m., and the New York City Fire Department (FDNY) was alerted at 9:12 a.m. The FDNY crew set up a command post in the north tunnel at a cross passage near to the fire. They relieved the wrecker crew and transmitted a 2nd alarm at 9:30 a.m. When the JCFD crews arrived at the tunnel portal, they also sent requests for more firefighters and for breathing equipment. The crews also worked on placing illumination inside the tunnel. The FDNY and JCFD called up 29 firefighting trucks of varying types and borrowed four more trucks with breathing apparatus from Consolidated Edison. In total there were about 63 emergency response vehicles (including police, medical units, Port Authority vehicles and supervisory vehicles).

Hot smoke caused a second fire to start, in a group of trucks apparently carrying paint and turpentine approximately 350 feet (110 m) west of the original fire. After this, the tunnel ventilation system was turned to full exhaust and full supply in order to extract smoke and reduce the likelihood of other spontaneous ignitions. New Jersey firefighters succeeded in extinguishing the second fire, and cleared a path for emergency vehicles to the first fire site where they linked up with the New York firefighters.

The tunnel fire main, a 6-inch (150 mm) water pipe cast directly into the secondary concrete lining, continued to function throughout the fire. The FDNY supplemented this with water from a 2.5-inch (6.4 cm) hose. The fire was the first time in the FDNY's history that it had been required to use four rescue squad vehicles at the same fire.

=== Tunnel ventilation ===
At 9:45 a.m. the tunnel's built-in ventilation system was turned to full extract and full supply in the zone of the fire. The supply of air through the duct under the roadway enabled firefighters to work without masks. Although the smoke in the tube was toxic, first responders were able to breathe by inhaling clean air from the curbside vents at the bottom of the tube. The extract duct above the roadway captured some of the smoke and when the false ceiling at the site of the fire collapsed, a hole formed between the road tunnel and the extract ventilation duct: this hole dramatically improved the capture of smoke at the main fire site, though it reduced smoke capture at the second fire site to practically nothing.

Two of the extract fans in the New Jersey vent shaft failed due to the heat of the fire; the shaft was approximately 300 feet (91 m) west of the fire, and was apparently drawing air at 1,000 °F (538 °C). The third fan was kept in working order by cooling it with a water spray.

=== Recovery and cleanup ===
By 1:00 p.m. the fire had been surrounded. The westbound tube, which had not been affected directly by the fire, reopened to two-way traffic at 2:15 p.m. However, work continued on cleaning up the eastbound tube and extracting the trucks that were trapped there. By 4:45 p.m., three trucks had been towed out of the New Jersey side. Despite a re-ignition of the fire at 6:50 p.m. the stop message was issued at 12:52 a.m. the next morning. The wreckage was cleared up quickly, and the eastbound tunnel reopened to traffic on the evening of Sunday, May 15.

== Aftermath ==
=== Injuries and death ===
In total, 66 people were injured, mostly by smoke inhalation. Of these, 27 were hospitalized One firefighter, Battalion Chief Gunther E. Beake, of FDNY Battalion 3 was severely affected by smoke inhalation and died of his injuries on August 23, 1949. Samuel Williams Sr. a laborer from Philadelphia, was also killed. He died the day of the fire.

=== Damage ===
The truck carrying carbon disulfide was completely destroyed, as were nine other trucks. 13 trucks were damaged. The infrastructure suffered extensive damage: approximately 650 short tons (590 tonnes) of rubble were removed during the weekend before the tunnel reopened. The tiles on the tunnel walls spalled off for a distance of approximately 200 feet (61 m) west of the fire site and 500 feet (150 m) east of it. At the site of the fire, the concrete lining of the walls spalled down to the ribs of the cast-iron primary lining. The false ceiling above the roadway, which consisted of a 6-inch-thick (150 mm), in situ, reinforced concrete slab, collapsed completely in several places and collapsed partially over a length of approximately 500 feet (150 m). The roadway itself was unharmed, but had a lot of debris on it. Half of the tunnel's long-distance phone cables had been severed during the fire.

The elevated side walkway had to be renewed over a length of 750 feet (230 m), and the cable ducts cast into the walkway and walls were replaced over 300 feet (91 m). Damaged power cabling, communications cabling and lighting were all renewed over the damaged area. The road surface was renewed over a length of about 500 feet (150 m).

The Port Authority decided that the tunnel could not be closed completely for the duration of the reconstruction. Instead, the south tube was closed at 8 p.m. each night, after which hundreds of feet of mobile scaffold and other equipment was hauled in. Reconstruction work was carried out overnight until approximately 4:30 a.m., at which time the construction equipment and scaffold was hauled out before the tunnel re-opened at 6 a.m. The repairs were completed by mid-August 1949.

=== Restrictions ===
At the time, the driver of the truck could only be charged with a misdemeanor, which carried a maximum fine of $50 and a jail sentence of up to five days. Thus, the driver was cleared of any criminal wrongdoing. After the fire, the Port Authority advocated for the enactment of stiffer fines in both the New York and New Jersey legislatures. Both states' legislative chambers introduced bills to that effect, but New York delayed the passage of its bill until May 1950. The aftermath of the fire also prompted an investigation from the United States District Court for the District of New Jersey, as well as scrutiny from insurance companies.

The Port Authority wanted the Interstate Commerce Commission to perform spot-checks on interstate trucking companies, but the ICC only had a staff of 20 people to do this job. The Port Authority ultimately decided to randomly search some of the 16,000 trucks that entered the tunnel each day, although in reality, the authority could only search one percent of each day's truck traffic.

Civil suits were filed against the trucking company as well as the manufacturer of the carbon disulfide. The trucking company whose truck had been involved, Apex Inc., was formally banned from using the tunnel in 1950.

== Sources ==
- Haerter, A., Contribution to discussion on session E, pp. Z51–Z53, Proceedings of the 1st International Symposium on the Aerodynamics and Ventilation of Vehicle Tunnels, Canterbury, 1973. BHRA 1974: ISBN 0-900983-28-0
- Riley, N. and Lelland, A., A review of incidents involving hazardous materials in road and rail tunnels, Proceedings of the 2nd International Conference on Safety in Road and Rail Tunnels, 1995; ISBN 0-9520083-2-7
- Skinner, F., The Holland Vehicular Tunnel under the Hudson River, Engineering, 1927.
- Singstad, O., Ventilation of Vehicular Tunnels, World Engineering Congress, Tokyo, 1929
