= Clifford Milburn Holland =

American civil engineer (1883–1924)

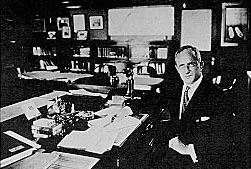
- Born: March 13, 1883; Somerset, Massachusetts, U.S.
- Died: October 27, 1924 (aged 41); Battle Creek, Michigan, U.S.
- Education: Harvard University
- Spouse: Anna Coolidge Davenport (m. 1908)
- Children: 4 daughters
- Engineering career
- Discipline: Civil engineer
- Projects: Holland Tunnel

Clifford Milburn Holland (March 13, 1883 – October 27, 1924) was an American civil engineer who oversaw the construction of a number of subway and automobile tunnels in New York City, and for whom the Holland Tunnel is named.

== Life ==
Holland was born in Somerset, Massachusetts. He was the only child of Edward John Holland and Lydia Frances Hood. He attended Cambridge Latin School. Holland graduated from Harvard University with a B.A. in 1905 and a B.S. in Civil Engineering in 1906. On November 5, 1908, he married Anna Coolidge Davenport (1885–1973), who was originally from Watertown and had graduated from Radcliffe College. They had four daughters.

Immediately after graduation, Holland began his career working as an assistant engineer on the construction of the New York City Subway's Joralemon Street Tunnel. He then served as the engineer-in-charge of construction of the Clark Street, 60th Street, Montague Street, and 14th Street tunnels. Each one was built by boring out a tunnel under the river bed, while keeping it filled with compressed air so the water would not seep into it. A protective cylinder was pushed into the tunnel, allowing workers to build a cast-iron lining.

Holland was the first chief engineer on the Hudson River Vehicular Tunnel project, earning an annual salary of $10,000. Holland conducted experiments in a small tunnel in a coal mine in Bruceton, Pennsylvania, in order to determine how to safely and sufficiently vent vehicles' carbon monoxide out of the tunnel and keep the passengers safe. Holland designed four ventilation shafts that would bring 3,500,000 cubic feet (99,000 m^{3}) of fresh air into the tunnel every minute. Construction on the tunnel began April 1, 1922, when Holland ceremoniously drove a pick into the ground at Canal and West streets in Manhattan.

The stress and long hours working on the tunnel project caused him to have a nervous breakdown, and he went to a sanatorium in Battle Creek, Michigan, in order to recover. On October 27, 1924, Holland died of a heart attack there at the age of 41. He died one day before the final charge of dynamite connected the two halves of the tunnel. At the time of his death, he lived at 2416 Avenue J in Midwood, Brooklyn. The funeral service was held at the Lefferts Place Chapel. Milton Harvey Freeman took over as chief engineer on the project after Holland's death. Freeman died five months later.

The project was renamed the Holland Tunnel in his memory by the New York State Bridge and Tunnel Commission and the New Jersey Interstate Bridge and Tunnel Commission on its opening day, November 12, 1924, sixteen days after Holland's death. At the time it opened, the Holland Tunnel was the first underwater vehicular tunnel in the United States and the fifth in the world.
