= Experimental Mine, U.S. Bureau of Mines =

- U.S. National Register of Historic Places
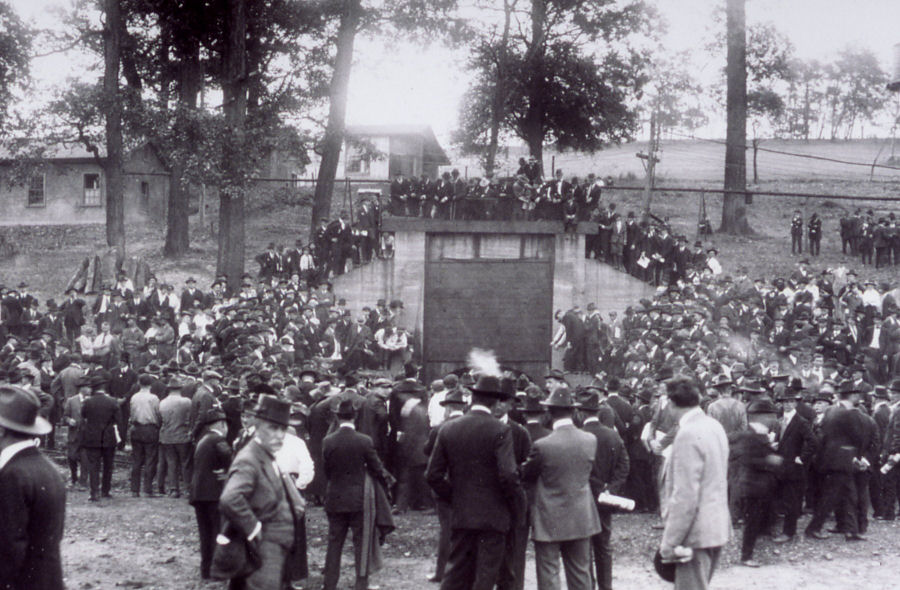
- Dedication of the Experimental Mine, 1910.

- Location within Pennsylvania Location within the United States
- Location: South of Bruceton, off Cochran Mill Rd.
- Nearest city: Bruceton, Pennsylvania
- Coordinates: 40°18′18.08″N 79°58′51.49″W
- Built: 1910
- Architect: U.S. Bureau of Mines
- NRHP reference No.: 74001732
- Added to NRHP: October 18, 1974

Experimental Mine, U.S. Bureau of Mines is a landmark located in the Bruceton suburb of Pittsburgh, Pennsylvania. In 1910, the newly created U.S. Bureau of Mines leased a 38-acre tract of land from the Pittsburgh Coal Company and opened the Experimental Mine.

One of the early findings in the Experimental Mine demonstrated that coal dust by itself was capable of propagating an explosion even in the absence of any methane gas. This demonstration was contrary to the old belief widely held at the time that coal dust could not explode without gas. This view had led to the very dangerous and widespread practice of using loose coal dust in mines to pack explosives in boreholes, which had cost many thousands of lives. These early experiments clearly proved that such a practice was too hazardous to continue.

== Current facilities ==
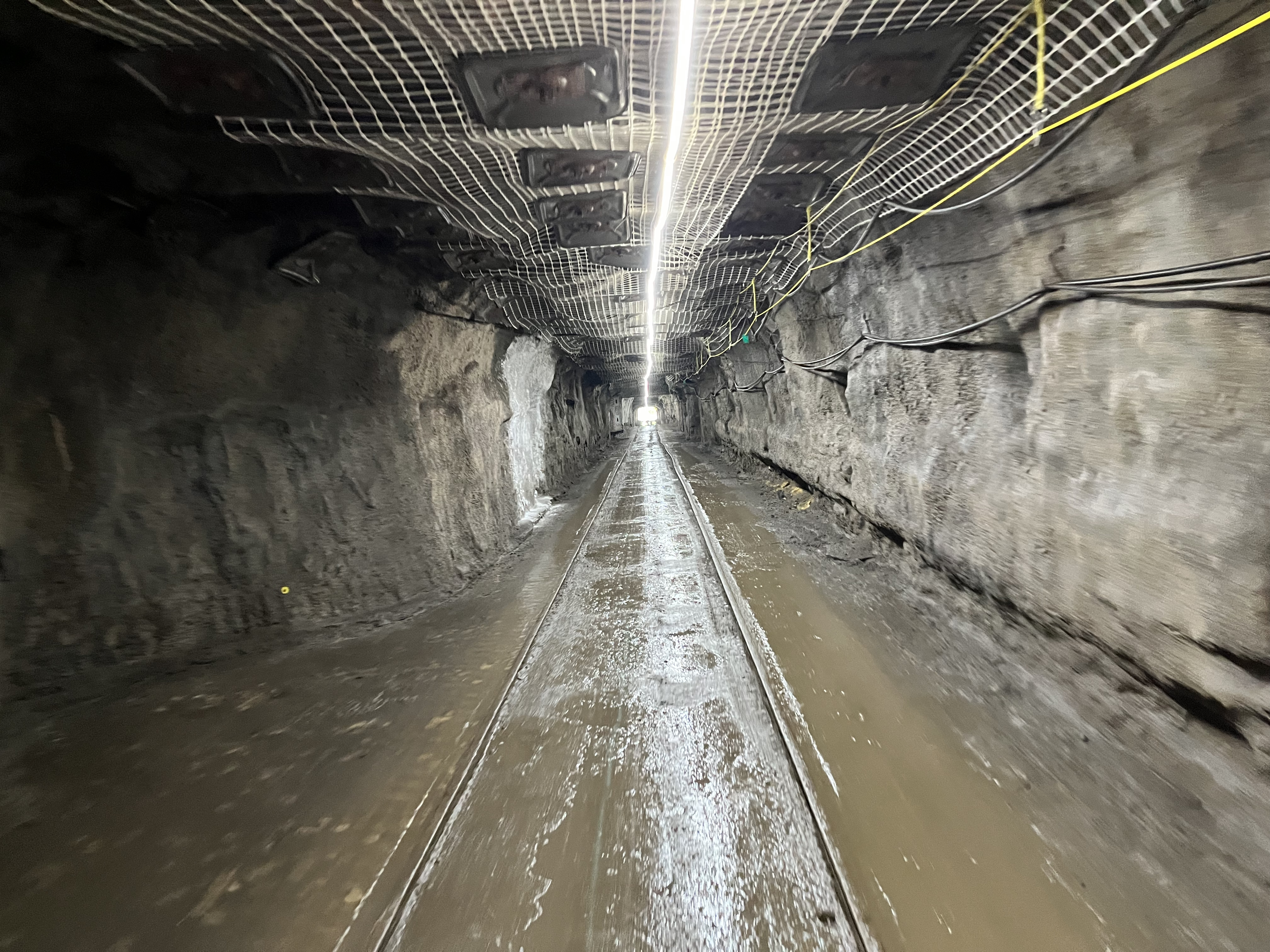
Inside the mine in 2022

By 1999 the complex made the transition to lab and office space as part of the National Energy Technology Laboratory network throughout the United States. The complex is home to three major agencies including the Federal Energy Technology Center (U.S. Department of Energy), the National Institute for Occupational Safety and Health (U.S. Department of Health and Human Services, Centers for Disease Control), and the Mine Safety & Health Administration (U.S. Department of Labor). Over one thousand government and contractor employees worked at the site by 2000.

== See also ==
- RDX
- Bruceton analysis
- National Energy Technology Laboratory
- National Register of Historic Places listings in Allegheny County, Pennsylvania
