= Bruceton, Pennsylvania =

Unincorporated community in Pennsylvania, US

- Unincorporated community
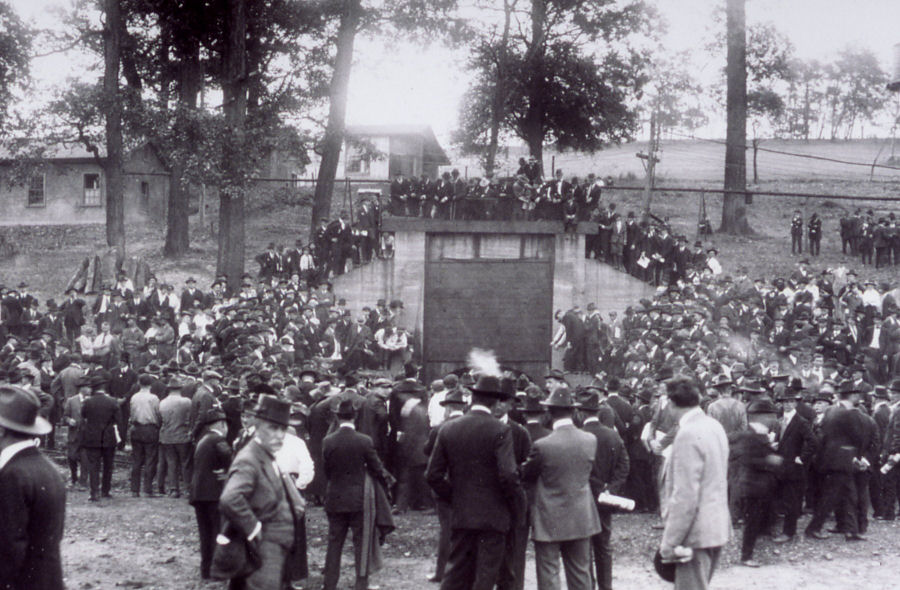
- Dedication of the Experimental Mine, 1910
- Interactive map of Bruceton, Pennsylvania
- Coordinates: 40°18′17″N 79°58′53″W
- Country: United States
- State: Pennsylvania
- County: Allegheny
- Borough/Township: Jefferson Hills, South Park
- Elevation: 961 ft (293 m)
- Time zone: UTC-5 (EST)
  - Summer (DST): UTC-4 (EDT)

Bruceton is a suburban area of Greater Pittsburgh within Allegheny County, Pennsylvania. While not an incorporated entity itself, its western half is part of South Park Township and its eastern half is part of Jefferson Hills.

Bruceton is the home of the Experimental Mine of the U.S. Bureau of Mines, which originally opened in 1910. It is also the home of the Pittsburgh Safety and Health Technology Center. The Pittsburgh and West Virginia Railway connected to the B&O Railroad in Bruceton. It is 185 miles (or 298 km) northwest of Washington D.C.

== History ==
In the early 1940s, the town hosted almost 100 scientists to help develop the Manhattan Project as a laboratory of the National Defense Research Committee including a month-long visit by Linus Pauling.

== See also ==
- Bruceton analysis
- Experimental Mine, U.S. Bureau of Mines
- George Kistiakowsky
- National Energy Technology Laboratory
- RDX
