= Lincoln Tunnel =

Tunnel between New Jersey and New York

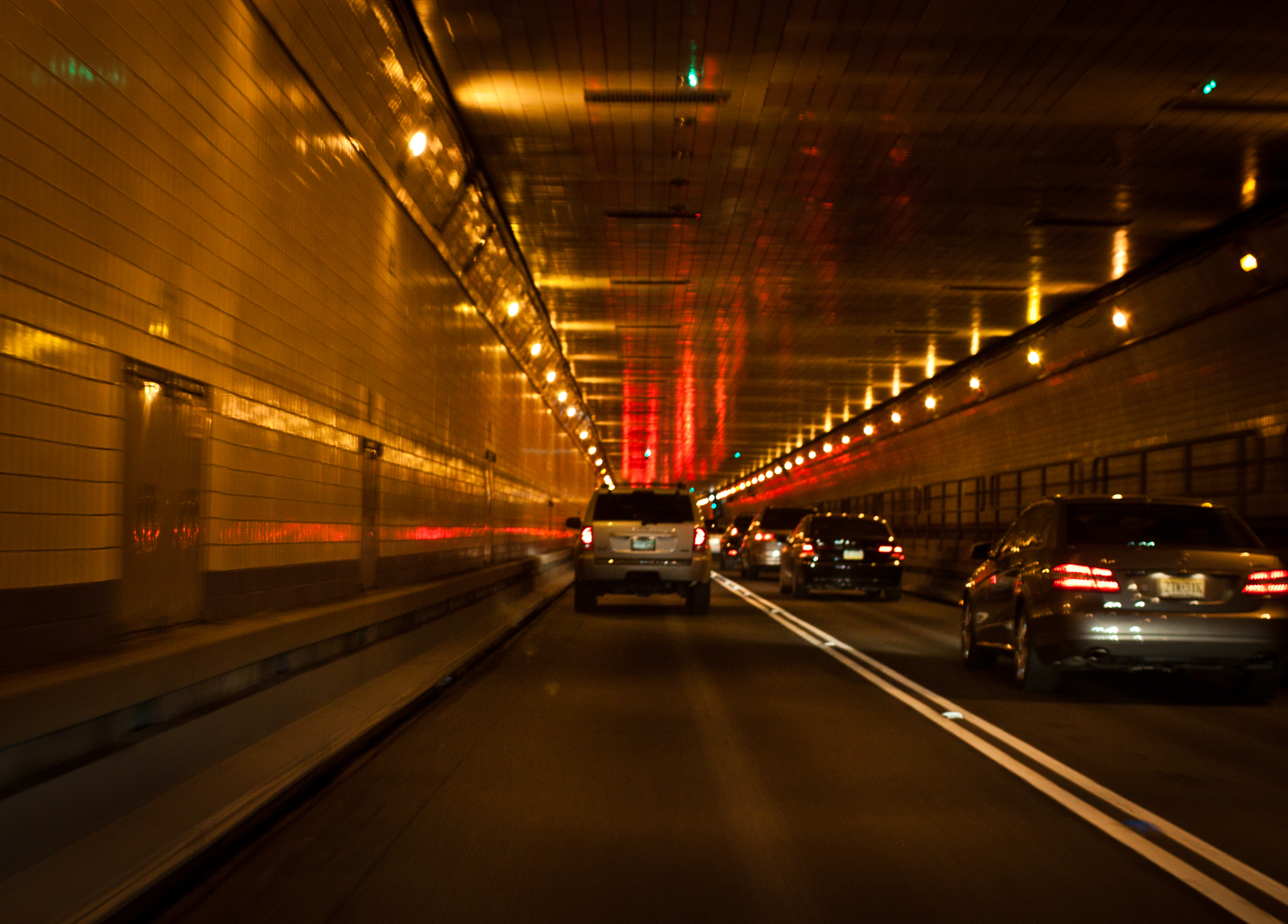
- Inside the tunnel, 2011
- Interactive map of Lincoln Tunnel

Overview
- Location: Weehawken, New Jersey, to Midtown Manhattan, New York City
- Coordinates: 40.7625°N 74.0111°W
- Status: Open
- Route: Route 495 (NJ side); NY 495 (NY side; unsigned and disputed)
- Crosses: Hudson River
- Start: Weehawken, New Jersey
- End: New York, New York

Operation
- Constructed: March 1934 – December 1937 (center tube); 1937–1938, 1941–1945 (north tube); 1954–1957 (south tube)
- Opened: December 22, 1937; 88 years ago (center tube); February 1, 1945; 81 years ago (north tube); May 25, 1957; 69 years ago (south tube)
- Owner: Port Authority of New York and New Jersey
- Operator: Port Authority of New York and New Jersey
- Traffic: Automotive
- Toll: For cars, eastbound only, as of July 12, 2026: Tolls by Mail: $23.30; E-ZPass Mid-Tier: $19.55; E-ZPass Peak: $16.79 (Weekdays: 6‍–‍10 am & 4‍–‍8 pm; Weekends: 11 am‍–‍9 pm); E-ZPass Off-peak: $14.79; Variable congestion charge incurred upon exit
- Vehicles per day: 112,995 (2016)

Technical
- Length: 7,482 ft (2,281 m) (north); 8,216 ft (2,504 m) (center); 8,006 ft (2,440 m) (south)
- No. of lanes: 6
- Operating speed: 35 miles per hour (56 km/h)
- Min elevation: −97 feet (−30 m)
- Tunnel clearance: 13 feet (4.0 m)
- Width: 21.5 feet (6.6 m)

The Lincoln Tunnel is an approximately 1.5-mile-long (2.4 km) tunnel under the Hudson River, connecting Weehawken, New Jersey, to the west with Midtown Manhattan in New York City to the east. It carries New Jersey Route 495 on the New Jersey side and the unsigned New York State Route 495 on the New York side. It was designed by Ole Singstad and named after Abraham Lincoln. The tunnel consists of three vehicular tubes of varying lengths, with two traffic lanes in each tube. The center tube contains reversible lanes, while the northern and southern tubes exclusively carry westbound and eastbound traffic, respectively.

The Lincoln Tunnel was originally proposed in the late 1920s and early 1930s as the Midtown Hudson Tunnel. The tubes of the Lincoln Tunnel were constructed in stages between 1934 and 1957. Construction of the central tube, which originally lacked sufficient funding due to the Great Depression, started in 1934 and it opened in 1937. The northern tube started construction in 1936, was delayed due to World War II-related material shortages, and opened in 1945. Although the original plans for the Lincoln Tunnel called for two tubes, a third tube to the south of the existing tunnels was planned in 1950 due to high traffic demand on the other two tubes. The third tube started construction in 1954, with the delay attributed to disputes over tunnel approaches, and opened in 1957. Since then, the Lincoln Tunnel has undergone a series of gradual improvements, including changes to security and tolling methods.

The Lincoln Tunnel is one of two automobile tunnels built under the Hudson River, the other being the Holland Tunnel between Jersey City, New Jersey, and Lower Manhattan. The Lincoln Tunnel is also one of six tolled crossings in the New York area owned by the Port Authority of New York and New Jersey. The tolls on each crossing are only collected in the New York-bound direction. As of 2016, both directions of the tunnel carry a combined average of 112,995 vehicular crossings every day. The tunnel is part of New Jersey Route 495 on the western half of the river, and New York State Route 495 on the eastern half of the river. However, the New York state highway designation is not signed, and its use is inconsistent in official documents.

== Description ==
=== Tubes ===
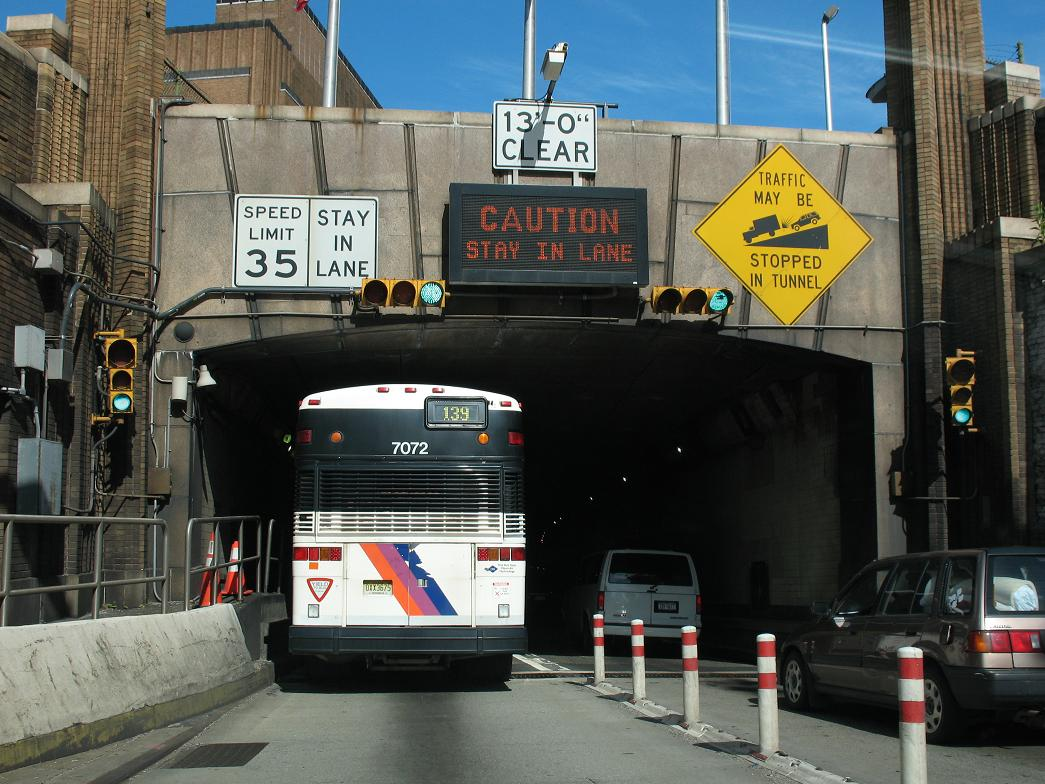
Entrance to the north tube from the New York side

The three tubes, operated by the Port Authority of New York and New Jersey (formerly Port of New York Authority), comprise six traffic lanes in total and carry a combined total of 112,995 vehicles per day as of 2016. In 2017, there were 19,039,210 tolls collected in the eastbound direction. Although the center tube normally provides one travel lane in each direction, both of the travel lanes in the tunnel's center tube are reversible and can be configured for peak-hour traffic demand if needed. The northern and southern tubes respectively carry westbound and eastbound traffic exclusively. Normally, only motor traffic uses the tunnel, but every year, a few bicycle tours and foot races pass through by special arrangement.

Each tube provides a 21.5-foot-wide (6.6 m) roadway with two lanes and 13 feet (4.0 m) of vertical clearance. Most vehicles carrying hazmats are not allowed in the tunnel, and trucks cannot use the center tube. There is a width limit of 8 feet 6 inches (2.59 m) for vehicles entering the tunnel.

Although the three portals are side by side in New Jersey, the north tube portal is one block west of the other two tubes' portals in New York City. The north tube's eastern portal is near Eleventh Avenue between 38th and 39th Streets, while the center and south tubes emerge side by side at Tenth Avenue between 38th and 39th Streets. As a result, the three tubes are of different lengths. The longest tube is the 8,216-foot (2,504 m) center tube, which runs parallel to the 8,006-foot (2,440 m) southern tube. The northern tube is 7,482 feet (2,281 m) long. On the Manhattan side, there is an Art Deco ventilation shaft located west of 12th Avenue.

Emergency services at the Lincoln Tunnel are provided by the Port Authority's Tunnel and Bridge Agents, who are stationed at the Port Authority's crossings. They maintain various apparatus such as fire trucks, rescue trucks, and wreckers for serious incidents. Port Authority workers also use cameras to monitor the tunnel.

=== New Jersey approach ===
The main approach road on the New Jersey side is Route 495, a state highway running in a west–east direction within an open cut through Union City. The New Jersey approach roadway, known as the "Helix" and formerly as the "Corkscrew", turns in a three-quarters circle before arriving at the entrance to the tunnel. This is because of the steep King's Bluff ledge in Weehawken, which is located right above the tunnel portal. The helix roadway extends over a distance of 4,000 feet (1,200 m).

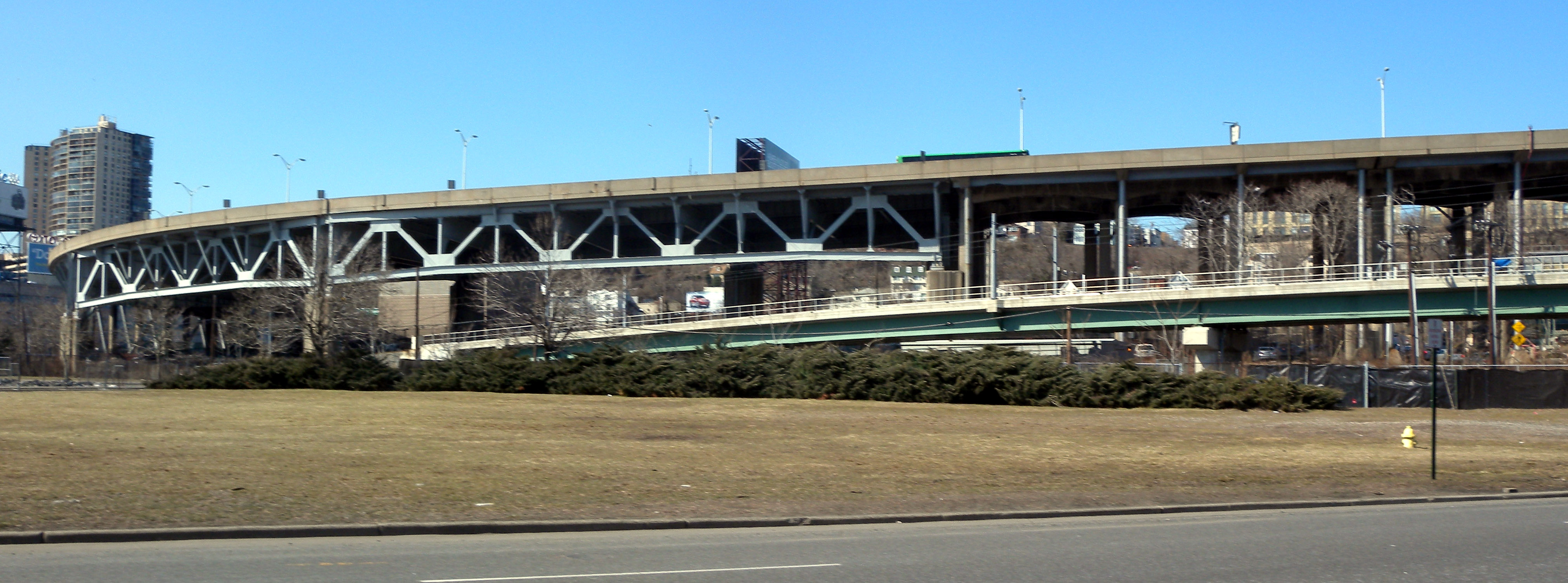
The Helix from the east. The highway descends from the top of the ledge (at right, not visible) to the tunnel's toll plaza (background).

Route 495 approaches the Helix from the west, crossing over John F. Kennedy Boulevard East. To the east of the JFK Boulevard East overpass, the roadway of Route 495 curves to the south and starts its descent. At this point, the westbound direction has a northbound ramp that diverges to two streets: northbound JFK Boulevard East, and northbound Park Avenue. Both directions of Route 495 continue south onto a rock shelf and then onto a viaduct, which descends before turning west and then north. While it curves west, the helix crosses JFK Boulevard East again, this time in an east-to-west direction. As the viaduct turns north, Park Avenue begins to follow the viaduct along its west side. The two directions split, and the ramp from the center tube to southbound Park Avenue rises between the two directions of traffic. The ramp from northbound Park Avenue to the eastbound tunnel merges to the outside (east) of the viaduct, while the ramp from the westbound tunnel to southbound Park Avenue dips into a short tunnel underneath the avenue. The avenue itself ascends King's Bluff in a relatively straight line from south to north.

As Park Avenue continues to ascend the ledge, the viaduct descends to ground level. The highway lanes then split into the portals for the three tubes, which are ornamented with stone. The tubes then curve east and cross under the Hudson River. This tollbooth has 13 toll lanes.

As of 2015, the Port Authority considered the Helix to have a working lifespan of ten years. Alternatives to its replacement included tunnels under the Palisades directly to the Lincoln Tunnel portals. In June 2018, the New Jersey Department of Transportation, which maintains Route 495, announced that it would renovate the structure of the Helix over the course of more than two years. According to the American Highway Users Alliance, the Helix is considered one of the most congested corridors in the east coast of the United States: as of 2018, drivers spent a cumulative 3.4 million hours per year sitting in congestion at the Helix.

An administration building is also located on the New Jersey side, along Boulevard East.

=== Manhattan approaches ===
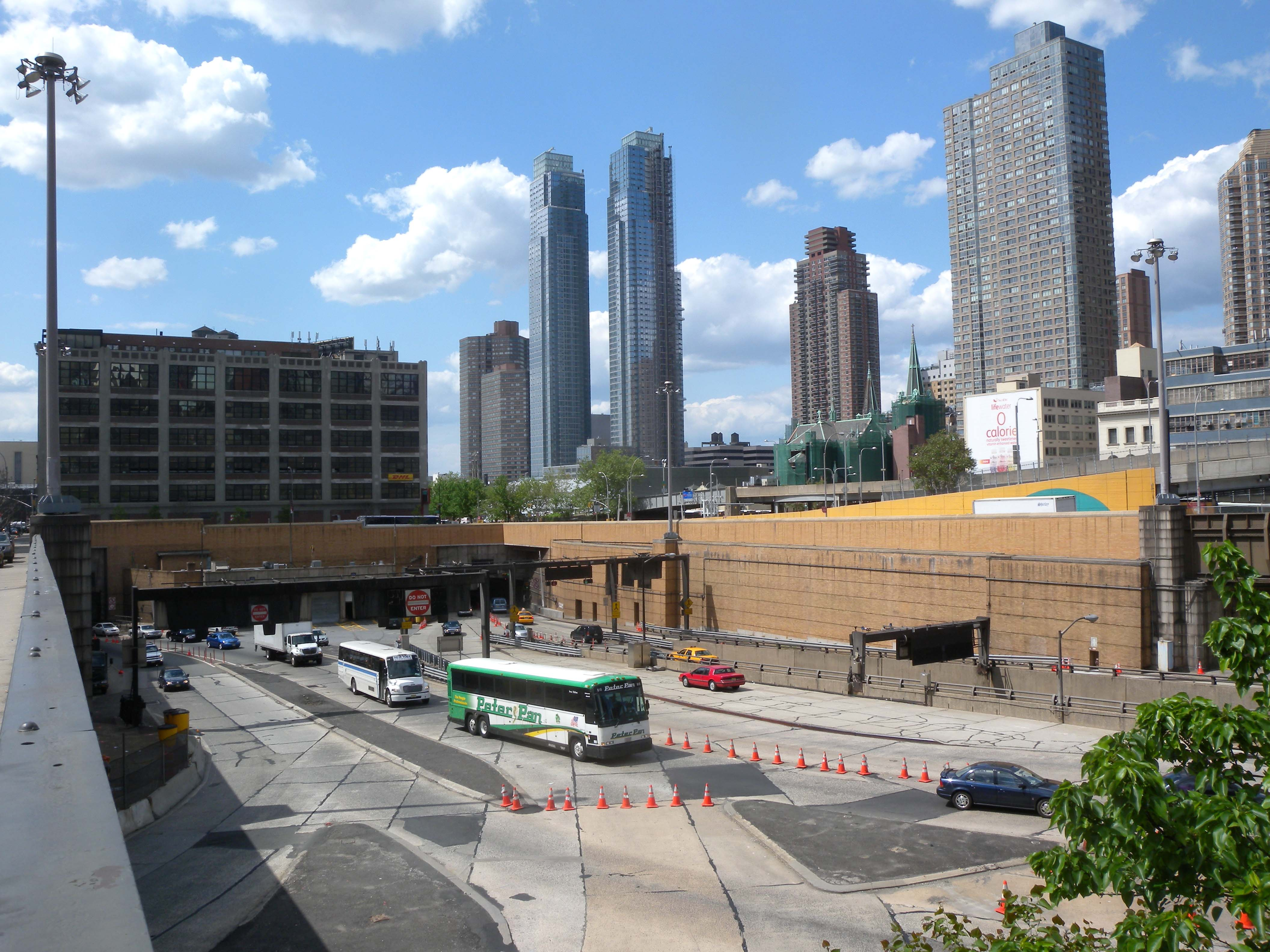
Manhattan portals of the south and center tubes

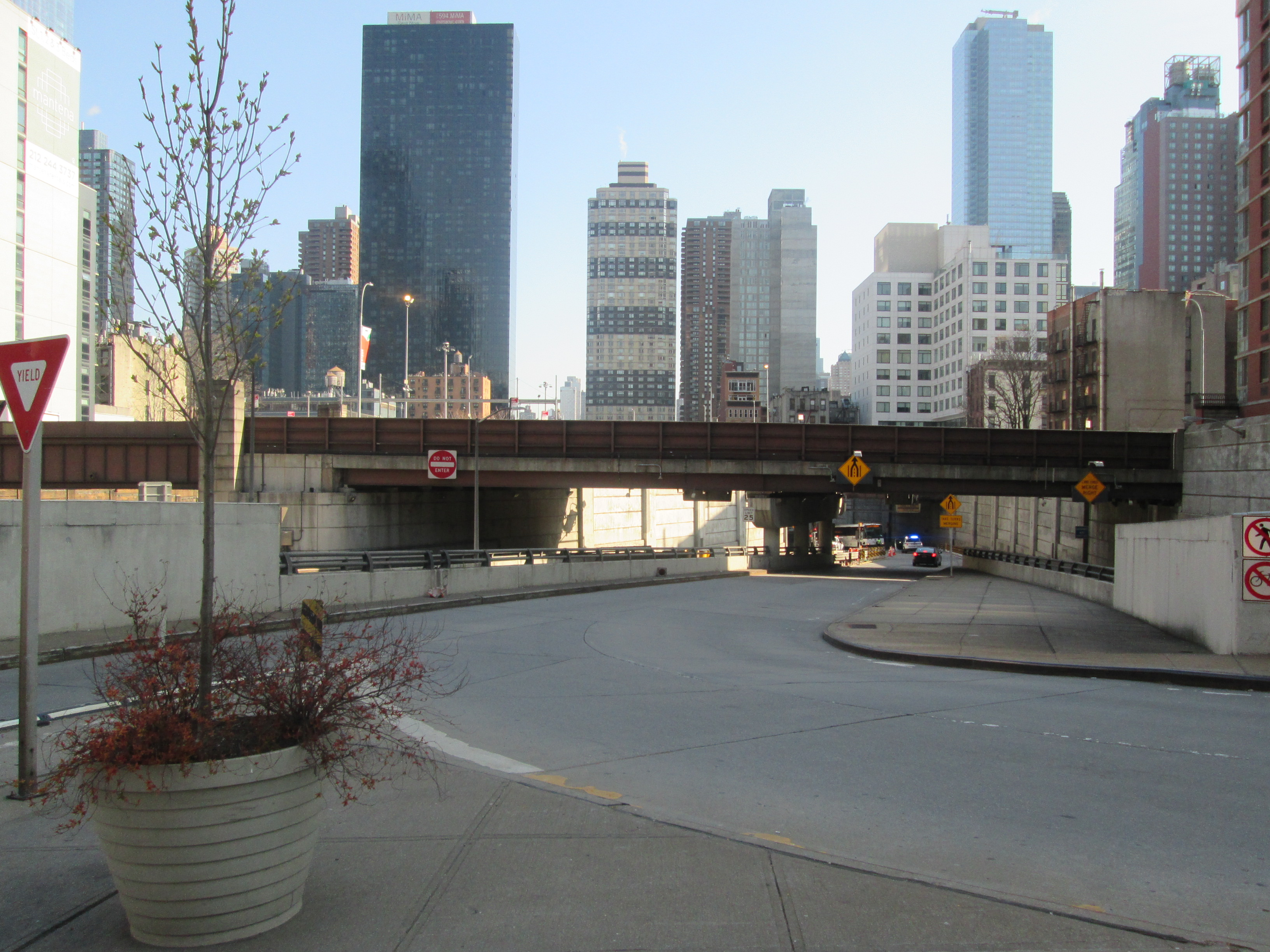
Northbound approach to the tunnel at 36th Street and Dyer Avenue

Traffic exiting the Lincoln Tunnel in Manhattan typically uses either Dyer Avenue, which also offers direct access to the Port Authority Bus Terminal, or the Lincoln Tunnel Expressway. Dyer Avenue runs in between Ninth and Tenth Avenues and exists in three segments: 30th–31st Streets, 34th–36th Streets, and 40th–42nd Streets. The Lincoln Tunnel Expressway, a bidirectional divided highway that passes below street level, connects the southernmost section of Dyer Avenue with the Lincoln Tunnel. The primary entrance roadways for the Lincoln Tunnel are Galvin Avenue, as well as the Lincoln Tunnel Expressway and the southern two sections of Dyer Avenue. Galvin Avenue runs in between Tenth and Eleventh Avenues and carries traffic southbound from 41st to 40th Streets.

The southernmost tube, which carries eastbound traffic to New York, surfaces just northeast of the intersection of 38th Street and Tenth Avenue. It leads directly to both the northern and southern legs of Dyer Avenue. The northern leg leads to 40th through 42nd Streets and carries northbound traffic only, while the southern leg leads to 36th through 34th Streets and carries both directions of traffic between these streets. At 36th Street, an exit ramp from the southbound Dyer Avenue leads to the Lincoln Tunnel Expressway, which continues to 31st Street (for westbound traffic) and 30th Street (for eastbound traffic). The surface section of Dyer Avenue continues to 35th Street, where westbound traffic can turn right, and then to 34th Street, where traffic can turn either left or right for eastbound and westbound traffic, respectively.

The center tube, which is reversible, ascends to ground level just southeast of 39th Street and Tenth Avenue, parallel to the southernmost tube. The tube funnels directly into the southbound Lincoln Tunnel Expressway, while an exit ramp leads to both legs of Dyer Avenue. A ramp from the northbound expressway also leads to the center tube.

The northern tube, carrying westbound traffic to New Jersey, is fed from four ramps. The first ramp originates from the intersection of 30th Street and Dyer Avenue, and leads to the northbound Lincoln Tunnel Expressway. This ramp carries traffic from both northbound Tenth Avenue and southbound Ninth Avenue. The second ramp diverges from eastbound 33rd Street and merges directly into the northbound expressway. The third ramp leads from the segment of Dyer Avenue that runs between 34th Street and 36th Street. This ramp carries traffic only from westbound 34th Street, but also contains interchanges with westbound 35th Street and both directions of 36th Street. The third ramp then merges with the expressway, which descends into a short tunnel until 10th Avenue and 40th Street. At this point, the highway surfaces and there is an option to exit on the left, to westbound 39th Street. This is marked as the last exit in New York. The fourth ramp merges with highway traffic at this point, carrying traffic from the intersection of 40th Street and Galvin Avenue. Traffic traveling eastbound on 40th Street is forced to enter this ramp, while westbound traffic on 40th Street and southbound traffic on Galvin Avenue have the option to either enter the ramp or continue on 40th Street. After the fourth ramp merges into the westbound expressway, the roadway dips into the northern tube just east of Eleventh Avenue.

=== Exclusive bus lane ===
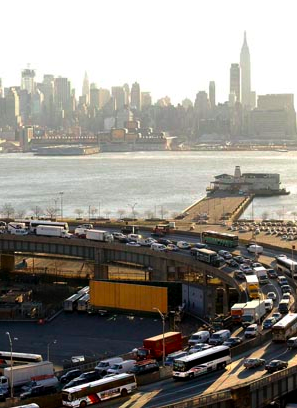
Lincoln Tunnel Helix during AM rush hour with buses using a normally westbound lane to approach tunnel toll plaza

During the morning rush hour, one traffic lane in the center tube, the Lincoln Tunnel Exclusive Bus Lane (XBL), is used only by buses. It is fed by the New Jersey Turnpike at Exits 16E and 17, and New Jersey Route 3.

The XBL is by far the busiest and most productive bus lane in the United States. The lane operates weekday mornings from 6:00 to 10:00 a.m., accommodating approximately 1,850 buses and 70,000 commuters, most of whom continue to the Port Authority Bus Terminal. The ridership on the buses using the XBL is higher than that on NJ Transit's commuter rail into Penn Station. Over 100 bus carriers utilize the Exclusive Bus Lane. New Jersey Transit operates fifty-seven interstate bus routes through the Lincoln Tunnel, as do numerous regional and long-distance companies.

The XBL was first proposed in 1964, when studies were conducted to address the feasibility of such a bus lane during the weekday morning peak period. The XBL was approved on a trial basis in September 1970, since buses from New Jersey would be stuck in the heavy congestion within the tunnel approaches. This bus lane was implemented in December of the same year, exclusively carrying buses during morning rush hours. Due to the success of the bus lane, it was made permanent after the year-long trial ended. The XBL was suspended in March 2020 in conjunction with restrictions related to the COVID-19 pandemic in the United States, and was reinstated in September as traffic reached pre-pandemic levels.

== History ==
=== Planning ===
The idea for a three-tube vehicular tunnel under the Hudson River, connecting Weehawken, New Jersey, with the West Side of Manhattan, New York, was first proposed by Darwin R. James in 1923. The tube's Manhattan entrance could be built at any point between 23rd and 42nd Streets, while the New Jersey entrance would be located directly across the river in either Hoboken or Weehawken. According to the New Jersey Chamber of Commerce, James's company had enough resources to commence construction. The first trans-Hudson vehicular tunnel, the Holland Tunnel downstream connecting Jersey City, New Jersey, with Lower Manhattan, was under construction at the time. Upon the Holland Tunnel's opening in 1927, it was popular among motorists, leading to the proposal for the Weehawken–Manhattan tunnel in early-1928.

The Weehawken–Manhattan tunnel, along with the Triborough Tunnel linking the East Side of Manhattan with the New York City borough of Queens, would help facilitate traffic to and from Midtown Manhattan. It was proposed that the two tunnels would eventually form a direct route from New Jersey to eastern Long Island via Manhattan and Queens. Another person proposed linking New Jersey and Queens directly via one continuous tunnel. By late 1928, both New York and New Jersey had elected new governors, Franklin D. Roosevelt of New York and Morgan F. Larson of New Jersey, and both supported the construction of new transportation links. General George R. Dyer, the chairman of New York's Bridge and Tunnel Commission, and Theodore Boettger, the chairman of the New Jersey's Interstate Bridge and Tunnel Commission jointly co-signed letters to each state's governor. After the Manhattan-Queens tunnel was formally recommended by the New York City Board of Estimate in June 1929, the heads of each state's respective bridge and tunnel commissions reiterated their proposal to extend the Manhattan-Queens tunnel to New Jersey.

The New York State Legislature considered two proposals for the Weehawken–Manhattan tunnel in January 1930. Although both would connect Weehawken to 38th Street in Manhattan, one proposal called for the Port Authority to build and operate the tunnel, while the other would entail operations by the "Joint Tunnel Committee", composed of the bridge and tunnel commissions of both states. Later that month, the New Jersey State Legislature created a committee that, among other things, would confer with New York officials regarding the plans for the Weehawken–Manhattan tunnel. In February of that year, New Jersey Governor Larson and New York Lieutenant Governor Herbert H. Lehman agreed to send bills to their respective state legislatures, which would authorize the construction of the tunnel.

Course of the Lincoln Tunnel under the Hudson River, as well as connecting roadways

Even though both states had agreed to build the Weehawken–Manhattan tunnel, there were disagreements on who would fund and construct the tunnels. The Port Authority and the two states' tunnel commissions both wanted to build the tunnel, but the Port Authority believed the tunnel would cost $95.5 million while the two states' tunnel commissions thought the tunnel would only be $66.9 million. Ole Singstad, chief engineer for both states' tunnel commissions, believed the distance between the two existing Hudson River vehicular crossings, the Holland Tunnel and George Washington Bridge, was large enough that the Weehawken–Manhattan tunnel would carry 10 million vehicles in its first year. By contrast, the Port Authority believed that the tunnel would only carry 7 million vehicles in its first year. Another funding issue arose after the Wall Street Crash of 1929, which caused several potential funding sources to be depleted.

The jurisdictional disagreement held up financing for the tunnel, but only briefly. In April 1930, the two states' tunnel commissions agreed to merge with the Port of New York Authority. The combined agency, a reorganized Port Authority, would build and operate the Weehawken–Manhattan tunnel. Six Port Authority board members were appointed by New Jersey Governor Larson as part of this merger. The agency would be headed by chairman John F. Galvin and vice chairman Frank C. Ferguson.

In June 1930, the Port Authority announced that the tunnel would be called "Midtown Hudson Tunnel". The same month, the agency began conducting a study of traffic patterns around the proposed tunnel's portals. By December, officials from both states were discussing preliminary plans for the tunnel. At the time, it was expected to begin construction the next year with an opening of 1938, and it was projected to cost $95 million, with both states paying a share of the tunnel's cost. In January 1931, the Port Authority decided that the Midtown Hudson Tunnel's construction was feasible. It recommended that the tunnel be constructed immediately so that the tube could begin carrying traffic in 1937. The $95 million cost was proposed to be offset by the 12.5 million vehicles that would use the tunnel in its first year. The preliminary plans included a "mixing plaza", where traffic to and from the Midtown Hudson and Queens-Midtown Tunnels would either enter the tunnels, exit into local traffic, or continue through the other tunnel.

The start of construction was delayed due to the onset of the Great Depression, a result of the 1929 stock market crash. The Port Authority could not market enough of its bonds at the 4 1/4% interest rate that it had decided on. The Port Authority applied to the federal Reconstruction Finance Corporation (RFC) for funds, but the RFC wanted the Port Authority to market these bonds at a 5% rate, which the Port Authority thought was too high. The Port Authority wanted to be able to market the bonds at a 4 1/2% rate, and so it would wait until such a rate was feasible. Despite a lack of funds for the Midtown Hudson Tunnel itself, the Port Authority was buying real estate within the tunnel's right of way, and by April 1932, had purchased much of the real estate within the tunnel's future path. In February 1933, Herbert Lehman, now the Governor of New York, announced that his Emergency Public Works Commission would seek a $75 million loan for the Midtown Hudson Tunnel from the RFC. In March, after nearly a year of negotiations, the RFC announced a tentative agreement to market these bonds at a 4 1/2% rate. The Federal Emergency Administration of Public Works (later the Public Works Administration, or PWA) advanced the Midtown Hudson Tunnel project a $37.5 million loan that August. The Port Authority accepted the loan, with the intent to start construction within two months. The loan would be repaid at a relatively low interest rate of 4%, although Galvin stated that this loan would only be sufficient to pay for one of the two tubes that were planned. At the time, the final properties in the tunnel's right-of-way had not yet been purchased.

Plans for the New Jersey approach were filed in September 1933. Initially, the approach would curve south to Bergenline Avenue in Union City, and in future phases, the approach would be extended across The Palisades to North Bergen. On the Manhattan side, the tube approach would rise to ground level at around 39th Street east of Tenth Avenue. Between Ninth and Tenth Avenues, the approach would then split in two directions with one roadway going south to 34th Street and the other going north to 42nd Street. The United States Department of War held a hearing about the proposed tunnel, in which it received only two complaints, both from shipping lines that were concerned about the Port Authority's intention to use "blankets" to cover the tubes. The blankets were to be located 40 feet (12 m) below mean water level, about the same depth as the bottoms of the shipping companies' vessels. The Department of War gave permission for the Midtown Hudson Tunnel's construction in October 1933, noting that the top of the new tunnel would be at least 60 feet (18 m) below mean water level, which would allow the Hudson River to be dredged to a lower depth if necessary. Preliminary borings were drilled in the bottom of the riverbed so builders could determine the geology of the tunnel's route.

=== First tube ===
==== Early progress ====
In November 1933, the Port Authority announced that it had picked the chief engineers for the Midtown Hudson Tunnel. These officials included O. H. Ammann as the Chief Engineer; Ole Singstad, the New York and New Jersey Tunnel Commissions' former chief engineer, as the Chief Tunnel Consulting Engineer; Ralph Smillie, the Triborough Bridge and Tunnel Authority chief engineer, as Design Engineer; Robert Ridgway and James Forgie as tunnel consultants; Charles S. Gleim as Engineer of Construction; and Port Authority Commissioner Alexander J. Shamberg as chief of the division that would oversee construction. The Port Authority's former chairman, John Galvin, would be retained as a consultant. The construction work itself would be supervised by George Breck Montgomery, who had served in the same position for the Holland Tunnel's construction.

The tube would stretch 6,000 feet (1,800 m) from the New Jersey side's ventilation shaft to the New York side's construction shaft, but the total length between portals would be 8,218 feet (2,505 m). It was slated to have a diameter of 31 feet (9.4 m) carrying a 21-foot-wide (6.4 m) roadway, with a cast-iron and steel outer lining and a concrete inner lining. This contract would also include the construction of ventilation shafts on each side, as well as 60 feet (18 m) of additional tunnel on the New Jersey side. The tube was to be bored using the shield-tunneling method, and shields would proceed from both sides at the same time. The shield on the New York side would pass through a caisson, which allowed air pressure in the tunnel to be maintained while the tube was being bored. Tunneling work would start on the New York side first because a construction shaft had already been sunk to the west of Eleventh Avenue, while the New Jersey shaft would be sunk later. Thirty-two ventilation buildings would be constructed, of which 15 would pull air into the tunnel, and 17 would exhaust air from the tunnel. The Port Authority received five bids for the construction of the Midtown Hudson Tunnel.

Construction began on the first tube, now the center of the three tubes, on May 18, 1934, with ceremonies on both sides. Officials from the federal, state, and city levels were in attendance at the ceremony on the New York side, where New York City Mayor Fiorello H. La Guardia and New Jersey Governor A. Harry Moore wielded picks to dig up the ceremonial first mound of dirt. The 700-ton cubical caisson for the New York side was floated into place and sunk into the riverbed in July. Even though the caisson had been manufactured in nearby Kearny, New Jersey, it had taken two days to be floated to Manhattan because the caisson was so large. Also in July, issues arose when the City of Weehawken refused to let the Port Authority conduct blasting for the New Jersey ventilation shaft for more than 12 hours a day. The Port Authority warned that this could delay construction. Another disagreement concerned the hiring of unskilled laborers to work on the Midtown Hudson Tunnel construction project. Unionized skilled laborers, who feared that their specialized jobs were being given to unskilled laborers, briefly threatened to strike over "unfair labor practices", as the author Angus Gillespie states in his book Crossing Under the Hudson. After twenty days, officials guaranteed that skilled jobs would be awarded only to skilled laborers, and work resumed.

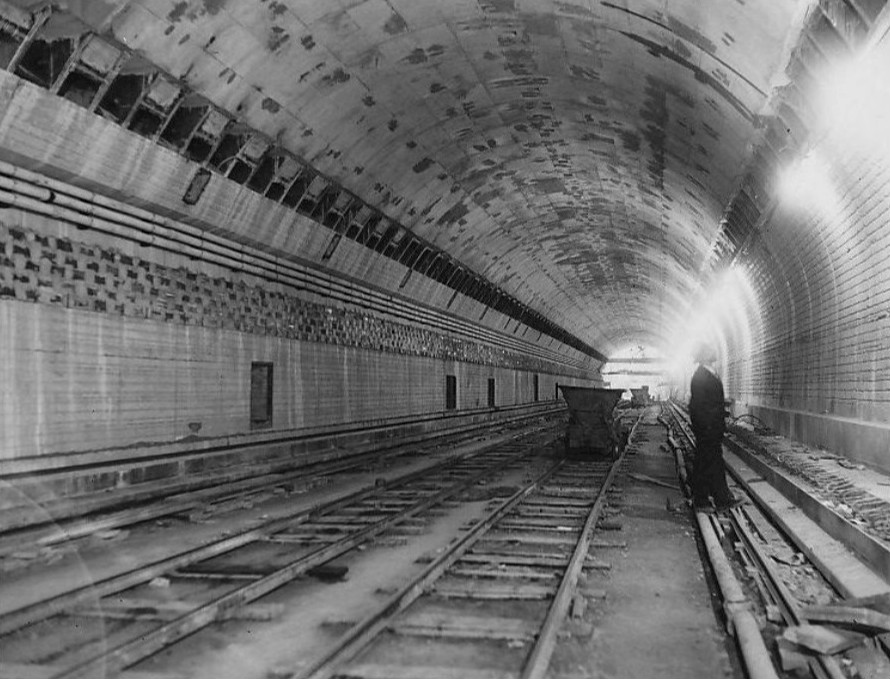
Construction progress, 1936

Meanwhile, the Port Authority still had not acquired and cleared all of the land in the way of the Midtown Hudson Tunnel's approaches. Construction of the approaches on the New York side necessitated the demolition of 91 buildings, mainly tenements, between Ninth and Tenth Avenues from 34th to 42nd Street. These buildings, located in the neighborhood of Hell's Kitchen, were seen as either being already dilapidated, or nearing such a condition. The demolition process was inadvertently aided by a fire that burned down one of the condemned buildings in October 1934. Bidding for the New York approach was opened in June 1935, by which point the demolition of the 91 buildings was well underway. On the New Jersey side, there were disagreements over how to construct the approach, since Weehawken had been built on a sharp ledge called King's Bluff. In July 1935, after discussing 75 proposals for two and a half years, the Weehawken town council voted to approve a distinctive "loop" approach. At the western end of the Midtown Hudson Tunnel in New Jersey, the tube would curve south and then end at a portal, where there would be a toll plaza. A road would diverge to the east, then quickly turn north and then west while ascending the ledge. This loop would lead from Hudson Boulevard East at the bottom of King's Bluff to Pleasant Avenue at the top.

Sandhogs, specialized construction workers, proceeded to dig the Midtown Hudson Tunnel from both ends, boring a tube that measured 32 feet (9.8 m) in diameter and 8,000 feet (2,400 m) between ventilation shafts. It was generally easier to dig from the New Jersey side, which consisted mostly of muddy sediment, than from the New York side, which contained many tons of rocks. Compressed air was used to prevent river water from flooding the tunnel, and a temporary bulkhead was built a few yards past the construction shaft, through which air was pumped. The tunneling shields continued digging past the bulkhead, within the pressurized chamber. An airlock was provided in order to prevent workers from undergoing sudden depressurization. Each sandhog worked two 3-hour-long shifts per day, punctuated by a break of three hours. After a section of the bore was completed, the sandhogs assembled segments of 14 curved metal pieces into rings that measured 31 feet in diameter and weighed 20 tons. During the process of construction, 145,000 cubic yards (111,000 m^{3}) of sediment and earth and 28,000 cubic yards (21,000 m^{3}) of rocky dirt were displaced, and 2,370 metal rings were installed. The reporter L.H. Robbins wrote a descriptive account of the construction work, comparing the tunnel shield to a "Steel Hercules", calling the sandhogs "ox-strong, rough-clad", and describing the tunnel itself as being like "a bit of the realm of Tartarus".

The Midtown Hudson Tunnel's vehicular tube was being excavated from both ends, but the teams on the New Jersey side worked faster because the ground there was softer. As a result, most of the work had been undertaken by the teams working from the New Jersey side, and the two ends of the tube were ultimately connected at the caisson on the New York side. The tunneling work posed some danger: three workers were killed in tunneling incidents during the first year of construction, and a dynamite accident in April 1935 killed three more sandhogs. The sandhogs dug at an average rate of 25 feet (7.6 m) per day, and by May 1935, workers from the New Jersey side had dug past the state border. By June, half of the tunnel had been excavated. During one week that month, sandhogs dug 250 feet (76 m) of tunnel, which the Port Authority proclaimed was world record in tunnel-digging. The two parts of the tube were connected in a ceremony in August 1935, four months ahead of schedule.

The method of financing the Midtown Hudson Tunnel was revised in late 1935. Originally, the Port Authority had advertised $34.3 million in bonds at a 4% interest rate, with the first issue of bonds set to mature in 1975. In November, the PWA announced that it would change the $37.5 million loan to a $4.78 million grant once the Port Authority had sold the PWA $22.3 million in bonds. The rest of the outstanding balance, approximately $10.4 million, was to be raised privately, and the Port Authority would have raised $32.7 million in bonds by the time the grant was awarded. The next month, the Port Authority awarded a $16.5 million bond issue at 3 3/4% interest rate. The PWA advanced the grant to the Port Authority in January 1936.

In December 1935, the Port Authority advertised bids for the Weehawken entrance plaza. The plaza consisted of the loop approach; garages for maintenance buildings; a tollbooth; a 145-foot (44 m) steel, brick, and sandstone ventilation building above the tunnel; a section of tube connecting the plaza to the existing underwater segment; and space for a second tunnel portal to the north of the first portal. By this time, the Midtown Hudson Tunnel project was one-third completed. The part of the tube that connected to the entrance plaza was holed-through in September of the same year. New Jersey civic groups stated that they needed to raise another $9 million in bond funds, since the construction of the proposed entrance plaza in Weehawken would bring the project's cost to $46.5 million. This cost would be composed of $42 million raised in bonds plus the $4.78 million PWA grant. That November, the Port Authority's commissioners authorized the agency to seek an additional $9 million in funds from the PWA.

Simultaneously, work began on retrofitting the tunnel for vehicular use, so it could be in operation by the time the 1939 New York World's Fair started. The retrofits consisted of installing ceiling panels with exhaust pipes; a roadway with air ducts; and straight retaining walls with ceramic tiles, metal police booths, and a catwalk for maintenance and emergency uses. Workers installed 800,000 glass tiles, each 6 inches (15 cm) square, along the ceiling of the tube, comprising what The New York Times described as "the largest glass ceiling in the world". After an unexpected gasoline leak from gas stations near the Midtown Hudson Tunnel, workers installed fireproof copper sheeting within the tunnel. By that October, most of the tube-retrofitting work had been completed, and the Midtown Hudson Tunnel was scheduled to open in fall 1937, several months ahead of schedule. The only major parts of the tunnel that had not been completed were the approaches on either side, but these were progressing quickly as well, as the New York approach plaza was already being excavated.

==== Nearing completion ====
By April 1937, the Midtown Hudson Tunnel was 75% completed, and its opening was projected for the next year. As the tunnel could be confused with the Queens–Midtown Tunnel on the other side of Manhattan, the Port Authority decided to rename the project that month. According to Gillespie, the Midtown Hudson Tunnel was renamed after U.S. President Abraham Lincoln because the Port Authority believed that the tunnel was "parallel to the importance of the George Washington Bridge", which had been named after the first U.S. President. Several other names had been considered and rejected. At the same time, the two under-construction approaches on the New York side were named after Port Authority chairmen who had been important figures in the Lincoln Tunnel's construction. Galvin Avenue, which would connect the tunnel north to 42nd Street, was named after John F. Galvin. Dyer Avenue, which would lead south to 34th Street, was named for General George R. Dyer, who had died by that point. A contract for the Weehawken approach, the first part of a future "express highway" to the tunnel (now New Jersey Route 495), was awarded in July 1937.

By October of the same year, the Lincoln Tunnel's first tube was very close to completion, and an inspection ceremony was held for New York and New Jersey politicians. The tube's opening was pushed forward several weeks from spring 1938 to late 1937. It was estimated that the construction of the Lincoln Tunnel had directly employed 2,800 workers at its peak, working a combined 6.3 million hours, and that workers across 40 states had worked for a combined 15 million hours to produce materials for the construction effort.

==== Opening and early years ====
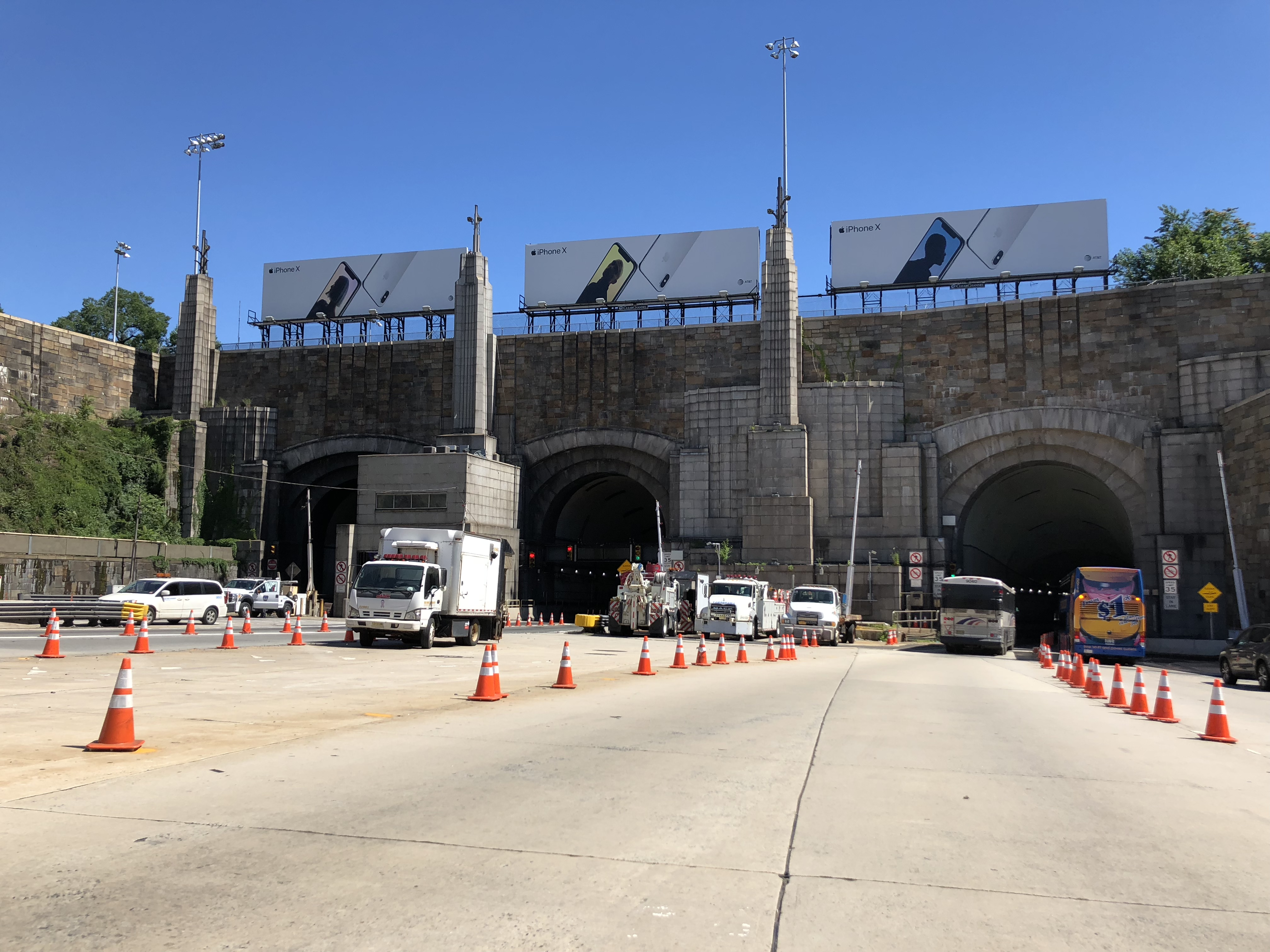
Entrance of the tunnel from Weehawken, New Jersey

The first tube was formally dedicated on December 21, 1937. The opening ceremony was accompanied by a military parade on the New Jersey side, as well as the detonation of a series of aerial bombs launched from military ships. It was also marked by separate speeches from New York City Mayor La Guardia and the governors of New York and New Jersey. The first vehicles began passing through the tube at 4:00 AM the next day. The sculptor Julio Kilenyi created a commemorative medal for the tunnel's opening ceremony, having created similar medals for the opening of the Holland Tunnel and George Washington Bridge.

The newly opened tube carried traffic in both directions. Passenger cars traveling in either direction were charged 50 cents for single trips, the same as on the Holland Tunnel, the George Washington Bridge, and the three bridges between Staten Island and New Jersey. If passenger-car drivers were traveling to or from Staten Island within the same trip, they paid 75 cents. Different toll rates applied to tractor-trailers, who paid $2, and motorcycles, who paid 25 cents. Pedestrians, animals, and bicyclists were prohibited from using the tunnel. Due to the limited capacity of the new tube, heavy trucks were temporarily banned, and a minimum speed limit of 20 miles per hour (32 km/h) was imposed until a second tube could be completed. Two gasoline-electric tow trucks, dubbed as the largest of their kind, were delivered to the Lincoln Tunnel in case a vehicle broke down. Two hundred staff were hired to oversee day-to-day operations of the tunnel, working at an administration building on the New Jersey side. Two telephone systems were also installed within the tunnel, one for communicating with workers in the administration building and the other for contacting emergency services.

The tube was used by 3,700 vehicles within the first 12 hours of its opening, and by 7,661 vehicles within the first 24 hours. The Port Authority devised a slogan to encourage motorists to use the tunnel, advertising it as "the Direct Way to Times Square" and erecting road signs to that effect.

Daily traffic counts decreased with the first month of the tube's opening, since the opening ceremony had coincided with the holiday travel season at the end of December 1937. In any case, the Lincoln Tunnel had carried less than 10,000 daily vehicles during the December holiday season, compared to the Holland Tunnel's 40,000 daily vehicles, since the Holland Tunnel contained two 2-lane tubes. The Port Authority marketed the new tunnel with the slogan "Don't Mark Time, Make Time, Use the Lincoln Tunnel", which was selected from a set of 3,500 Port Authority employees' proposals. The Lincoln Tunnel saw 1,790,640 vehicles during its first year of operation, but it was not yet profitable: even after all toll revenues were accounted for, the Port Authority had spent a net $953,857 on operating the tunnel. By 1940, the tunnel was carrying 4 million vehicles annually, and by 1942, that count had increased to 4.5 million. A preliminary 1944 estimate put that year's vehicular count at 5.5 million, due to traffic increases during the war.

At the time of the tube's opening, six interstate bus companies filed plans to run a combined 250 buses per day through the tunnel. Previously, buses from Weehawken had to drive onto ferries to access Manhattan, but in July 1938, the Interstate Commerce Commission granted the bus companies permission to use the tunnel. Buses paid a toll of $1 per direction. By March 1939, there were 600 buses per day using Lincoln Tunnel, running on twelve routes operated by five companies. That month, three more bus companies were given permission to operate an additional combined total of 600 buses. After this permission was granted, the New York City government opposed any further authorizations for bus companies, since they would cause congestion in Manhattan streets. In December 1940, it was announced that a new bus terminal would be built on the Manhattan side of the Lincoln Tunnel, between Eighth Avenue, 41st Street, Ninth Avenue, and 42nd Street. Manhattan Borough President Stanley M. Isaacs proposed building a short tunnel between the Lincoln Tunnel and the new terminal. The city approved the construction of the new terminal and connecting tunnel in January 1941. Plans for a bus terminal were delayed because of World War II, which used the resources intended for most projects that were not directly involved in the war effort.

=== Construction of second tube ===
In November 1936, as construction on the first tube was winding down, the Port Authority's commissioners met to discuss the feasibility of adding a second tube, located north of and parallel to the first tube. Although the original design in 1933 had called for two tubes, the PWA funds had only covered the cost of the first tube. It was estimated that if a second tube were to be built immediately, the cost of that tube would be cheaper because the workers and machinery were already on site. The commissioners thus agreed to construct a second tube, which was expected to cost an additional $33 million, bringing the total cost of the project to around $80 million. The next month, the Port Authority sold a $10 million bond issue at a 3% interest rate. In August 1937, the PWA issued $29.1 million in funds for the second tube, consisting of a $26 million loan and a $3.1 million grant. By the time the first tube had opened in December 1937, the cost of construction had risen to $85 million. At the time, the second tube was set to be completed in 1940.

A contract for the second tube was released in February 1937, at a cost of $8.7 million. That July, a steel caisson, similar to that for the first tube, was sunk into the Manhattan side at the western end of 39th Street. The next month, three parcels of land in New Jersey were acquired to make way for the second tube. The second-tube project would include the construction of the "express highway" in New Jersey, which would connect to NJ 1 (now part of U.S. 1) and NJ 3 in western North Bergen. At the time of the first tube's opening, the express highway ended at the toll plaza just outside the tunnel portal, leading to Boulevard East and Park Avenue. Bidding for the express highway began in January 1938, and a contract for the "helix" ramp to the express highway was awarded in April of that year.

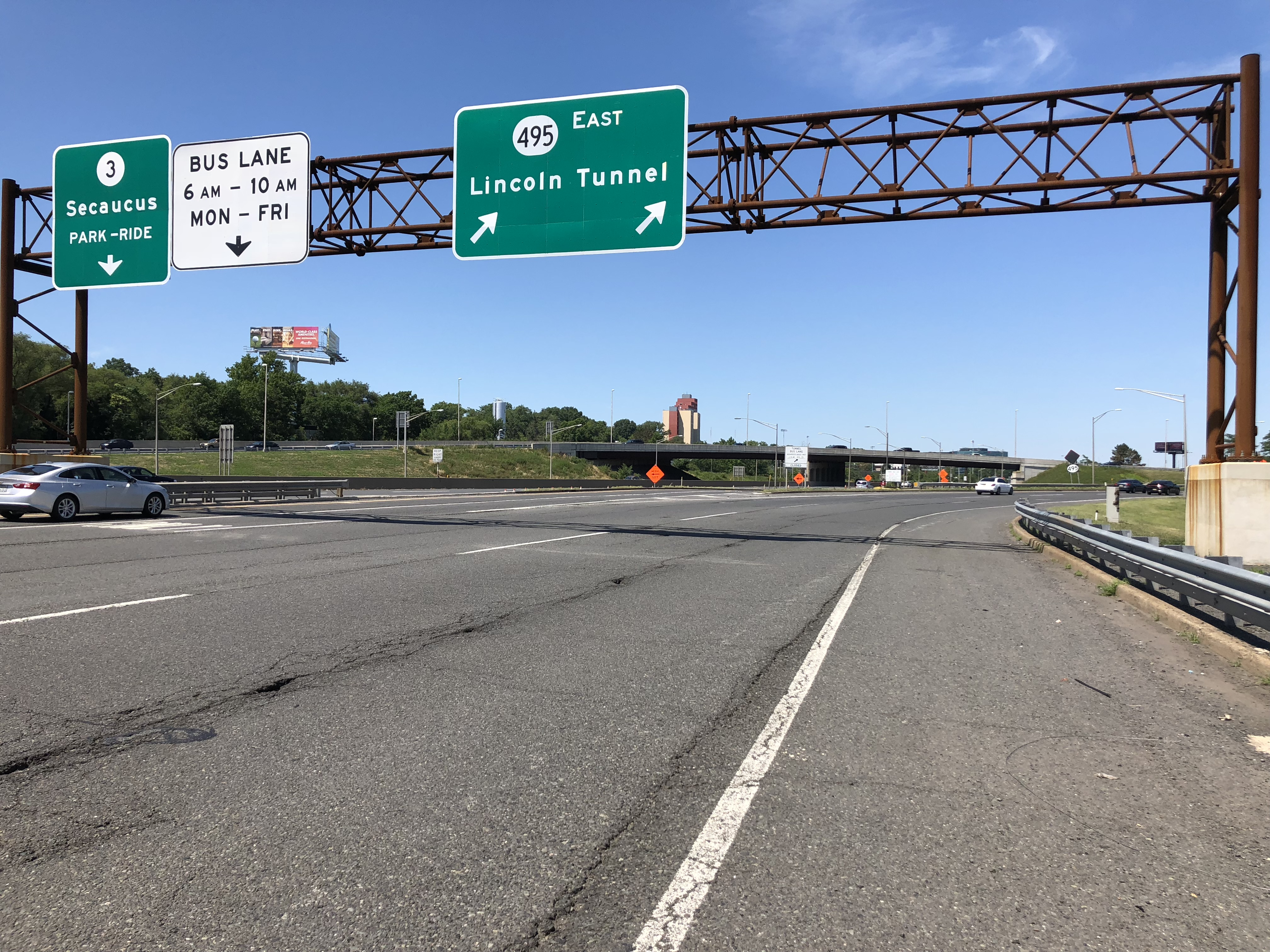
The express highway to Lincoln Tunnel from the New Jersey Turnpike, which is part of New Jersey Route 495

Boring work on the tube itself proceeded quickly, and in May 1938, the two segments of the second tube were holed-through. This was significant because the second tube was only 75 feet (23 m) away from the first tube, and for the past five months, boring operations had proceeded while traffic was running in the adjacent first tube. However, work on the second tube was halted the same month because New Jersey had failed to build sufficient approach roads to accommodate the extra traffic load. Economic considerations also played a significant role in the work stoppage, since the New Jersey Highway Commissioner had said that the state lacked enough money to build these new highways. The ends of the second tube were sealed because it was thought that there would not be enough traffic flows to the first tube to allow for the completion of the second tube. The six-lane "loop" road, an approach to the future express highway, opened in October 1938 and extended west to Pleasant Avenue, located at the top of the King's Bluff ledge. In June 1939, the Port Authority opened the section of the express highway from Pleasant Avenue west to NJ 3. The new highway, a six-lane divided road running in an open cut, was designated as an eastern extension of NJ 3.

Work on the second tube resumed in April 1941 as part of the Port Authority's 20th-anniversary ceremony, the "Port Preparedness Dedication." The United States Army had deemed the Lincoln Tunnel to be an important part of wartime defense, and so the Port Authority expedited plans for completing the tube by 1943 at a cost of between $9 million and $12 million. The Manhattan portal of the new tube was to be located one block west of the original tube's portal, and in August 1941, the Port Authority awarded a contract to build a roadway connecting from the original tube's plaza to the new tube's portal. A new street, Galvin Avenue, was created from 42nd to 40th Streets, running between 10th and 11th Avenues and carrying southbound traffic to the westbound tunnel. On the New Jersey side, contracts were awarded for the westward extension of NJ 3 to Little Falls, New Jersey, as well as the construction of a portion of what is now US 46.

Due to wartime material shortages, further construction was delayed for the next two years. Significant progress on the second tube only resumed in late 1943. By January 1944, work on the new tube was being accelerated because the existing tube now had heavy congestion in both directions during rush hours, as opposed to the situation in mid-1942, where congestion generally only accumulated toward New York in the morning and New Jersey in the evening. At this stage, much of the second tube had been completed to the point where traffic could use it in case of an emergency, and the tube was planned to be opened that July. However, work was again delayed, and in November of the same year, the Port Authority announced that the new tube would open the following February.

=== Operation of two tubes ===
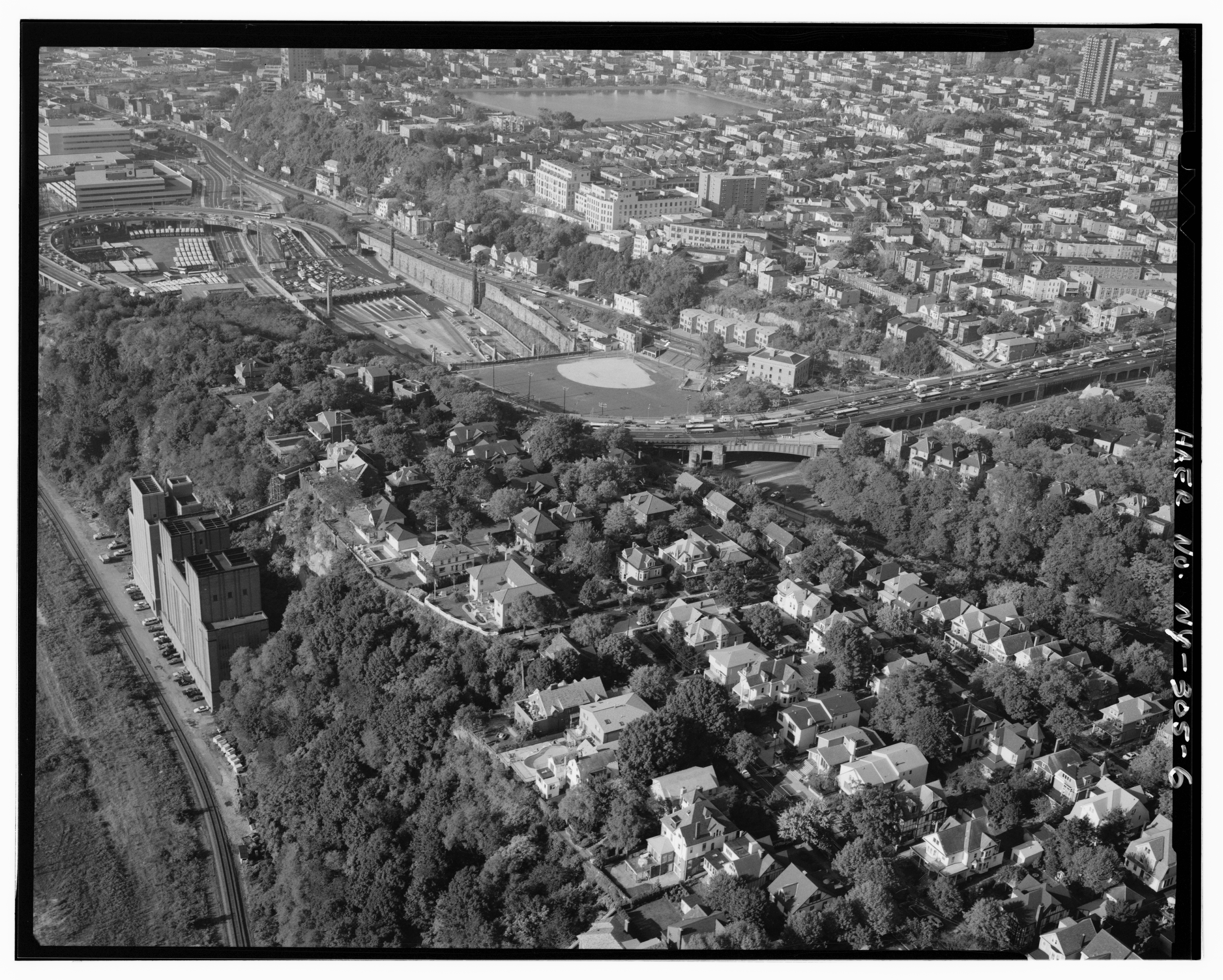
Congestion on the New Jersey approach

The second tube opened at noon on February 1, 1945. The new tube was located to the north of the existing tube. The northern tube was configured to carry westbound traffic to New Jersey, while the southern tube was converted from a two-way tunnel to an eastbound-only tunnel to New York. The construction of the two tunnels had cost a combined $80 million. Unlike for the first tube, there was no official ceremony, although three Port Authority officials drove through the second tube. The first motorist to drive through the second tube was Michael Katen, the brother of Omero C. Catan, the first motorist to drive through the original tube in 1937.

After World War II ended in 1945, plans for a new bus terminal on the Lincoln Tunnel's Manhattan side were revisited. The new bus terminal, which was to be built on the block bounded by 40th and 41st Streets and 8th and 9th Avenues, was approved in January 1947. The plan was later modified to include a 500-space parking lot on its roof, which would be accessible via a series of ramps from both local streets and the Lincoln Tunnel. The terminal opened in 1950 as the Port Authority Bus Terminal.

=== Third tube ===
==== Planning and controversy ====
In 1949, due to increased traffic demand, New Jersey Governor Alfred E. Driscoll suggested building a third crossing under the Hudson River. He met with the Port Authority's board of commissioners and told them that the Holland and Lincoln Tunnels had now reached their full capacity of 15 million annual vehicles apiece (though the Port Authority noted that the Lincoln Tunnel had only seen 11.1 million vehicles in the past year). The same year, the Port Authority conducted a study of 135,000 motorists who used Hudson River crossings. It found that much of the traffic on the Holland and Lincoln Tunnels could be lessened if another tunnel between New Jersey and Midtown Manhattan were built either north or south of the Lincoln Tunnel.

In May 1950, the Port Authority's commissioners authorized an engineering study for an additional tube to the Lincoln Tunnel. If built, the third tube would be located to the south of the two existing tubes, and it would contain two additional lanes at a cost of $60 million. The Port Authority also began a study on whether local streets near the Lincoln Tunnel's existing approaches could accommodate traffic from a third tube. In February 1951, Port Authority chairman Austin J. Tobin announced that traffic across the Hudson River had increased to a point where the construction of a third tube would soon be necessary. The next month, the Port Authority commissioners gave their approval to preliminary plans for the third tube, which was expected to cost $85 million and be completed by 1957 "barring total war". The project would also involve extending the Dyer Avenue approach, on the Manhattan side, southward from 34th Street to 30th Street.

The Port Authority gave its approval to the construction process itself in May 1951, although the approval of New York City, New York State, and New Jersey officials was still needed. The New York City Planning Commission rejected the initial plans for the third tube project in August 1951 because it felt that the existing tunnel approaches could not sufficiently manage all of the traffic from a third tube, but it scheduled a meeting for September, during which the Port Authority could argue in favor of its proposal. The city's construction coordinator, Robert Moses, also opposed the third tube, and Tobin pointed out that the only major opposition the Port Authority had received was from Moses. Manhattan Borough President Robert F. Wagner Jr. was among the New York City officials who supported the plans. In September, after the Port Authority and the City Planning Commission convened to discuss the plans, the Planning Commission rejected the third-tube plans for a second time, calling them "fundamentally deficient". Despite this disagreement, the Port Authority released contracts for test bores the same month. The dispute continued through the end of the year, and by December, the Port Authority had to cancel a $10 million contract for cast-iron tunnel segments because the city had refused to approve the tunnel plans. The city wanted the Port Authority to build part of a proposed Mid-Manhattan Expressway above 30th Street from Eighth Avenue to the West Side Elevated Highway near 12th Avenue. This recommendation was very similar to one that had been made five years prior. However, the City Planning Commission immediately rejected this proposed solution. By January, as the Lincoln Tunnel dispute became protracted, the Port Authority was willing to build a separate tunnel altogether at a cost of $200 million.

The New York City Board of Estimate pushed back a proposed vote on the Lincoln Tunnel from March to May 1952. By June, a compromise had been worked out, and the city had given its assent to the new tube. Although the Port Authority was no longer obligated to construct a mid-Manhattan expressway, it did agree to widen 30th Street between 10th Avenue and 12th Avenue, and to provide ramps between the tunnel and the West Side Highway. The New York City government quickly moved to approve street upgrades on their side of the tunnel. By this point, the Weehawken, New Jersey, government had also started to raise concerns about street improvements on their side. However, there were no other major obstacles to starting construction. The first contract for the third tube's construction, a bid for digging the ventilation shafts, was awarded in August 1952. A groundbreaking ceremony for the third tube, marking the start of official construction on that tube, was held the next month at the Manhattan side's future ventilation shaft. Sandhogs began digging the tunnel from that end.

==== Construction ====
The Port Authority awarded its first material contract for the third tube, a $10 million order of steel tunnel segments from Bethlehem Steel, in October 1952. It also evicted 900 families from 70 buildings to make way for the new tube's approaches. The next month, the agency ordered 1.2 million bolts and washers to secure the tunnel segments. The Port Authority planned to finance the third tube's construction with a consolidated bond offering of $500 million, which would be dispersed among other Port Authority projects as well. An initial bond offering of $35 million was made in December 1952, and the Port Authority later borrowed $20 million to finance this offering. A contract to dig the actual bore under the river was awarded in October 1953.

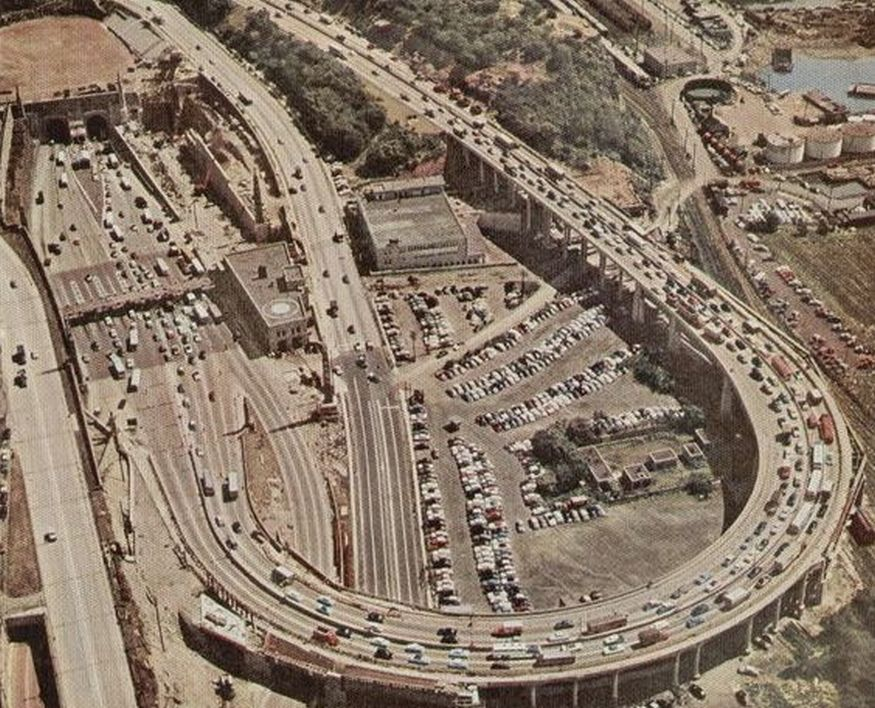
View of New Jersey entrance in 1955, with the south tube under construction

Weehawken's government still held a negative attitude toward the Lincoln Tunnel digging work, and in June 1953, ordered policemen to arrest workers who were bringing equipment into the tunnel, under the pretense that the tunnel lacked a building permit. In response, the Port Authority obtained a writ from a Hudson County, New Jersey, judge, who allowed tube work to proceed and forced the Weehawken government to explain its legal reasoning for blocking the tube's construction. A committee of New Jersey politicians was convened to determine how much the Port Authority should pay the town of Weehawken for land acquisition. Representatives and residents of Weehawken wanted more compensation than what the Port Authority was willing to offer. On March 16, 1954, the Supreme Court of New Jersey ordered that work on the third tube be halted because it was tantamount to a brand-new crossing, rather than an addition to an existing crossing. However, the New Jersey legislature voted to allow the resumption of work on the tunnel, while the New York state legislature finally gave formal authorization for the Port Authority to build the tube. Eight days after the New Jersey Supreme Court's stop-work order, construction resumed on the tube. The township of Weehawken agreed to tax the tunnel at a lower price than what it was originally asking.

A contract for a ventilation building on the New York side, above 38th Street east of 12th Avenue, was let in June 1954. That September, the Port Authority opened the contract for the renovation of the New Jersey side's tunnel plaza, which would have to be rebuilt in order to accommodate the new tunnel portal, since the existing administration buildings were located in the path of the third tube's approach. The same month, the Port Authority published plans for an 800-space parking complex on the New Jersey side. This parking lot opened in November 1955, fourteen months later.

Meanwhile, sandhogs began digging the tunnel from a 55-foot-deep (17 m) pit on the New Jersey side, with plans to connect that bore with the tunnel being dug from the New York side at a point 95 feet (29 m) under the Hudson River. The pieces for a pressurized digging shield were hoisted into the New Jersey construction pit in late September 1954, and the completed shield began digging toward New York a month and a half later. In February 1955, the Port Authority awarded contracts for widening the New Jersey side's loop approach from six to seven lanes, as well as a second contract for widening the North Bergen, New Jersey, "express highway" from six to eight lanes, and a third for a new toll plaza at the bottom of the loop approach. By this time, it was projected that a new Hudson River crossing might need to be built north of the Lincoln Tunnel by the 1960s. The boring operation from the New Jersey side had crossed eastward into the state border by October 1955.

Work on the tube was temporarily stopped in January 1956 after water from the Hudson River leaked into the New York side of the tunnel. Almost immediately after the tube had been pumped dry, workers went on strike for a week, even though the ends of the bores were only about 350 feet (110 m) away from being connected. Construction was further disrupted by an air leakage on the New York side in May, and a contractors' strike in June. On June 28, 1956, the two sides were finally holed-through by the respective governors of each state. At this time, the last of the tube's 2,031 cast-iron rings had been laid. Contractors then began placing tiles along the surface of the tube. By November, the tube was nearly completed. To accommodate the traffic for the new tube, the Port Authority opened the Lincoln Tunnel Expressway south to 30th Street in February 1957.

The third tube opened on May 25, 1957, to the south of the original two tunnels. It cost $94 million, 6% less than projected; the tube itself had only cost $44 million, but the approaches cost $23 million and other costs made up the remaining $27 million. The third tube's opening made the Lincoln Tunnel the world's first tunnel with three separate, parallel tubes. Unlike with the previous two tubes, which had killed a total of 15 workers, no one had been killed during the construction of the third tube. At this time, the center tube was converted back to a bidirectional tube, while the new third tube became eastbound-only. The center tube could be used for unidirectional traffic during peak hours, doubling capacity in the peak direction. A traffic light system was instituted for the center tube to indicate whether a given direction could use one or both lanes. A new 18-booth toll plaza was inaugurated on the left side, collecting tolls on the left-hand (driver's) side of each lane; this replaced the previous right-handed 12-booth plaza, which collected tolls from the passenger side, and was thus expected to speed traffic. The agency also inaugurated two extra ventilation buildings, which would filter air from the new tube. Due to increased traffic loads, the New York City government released plans to widen nearby streets later that year.

=== Later years ===
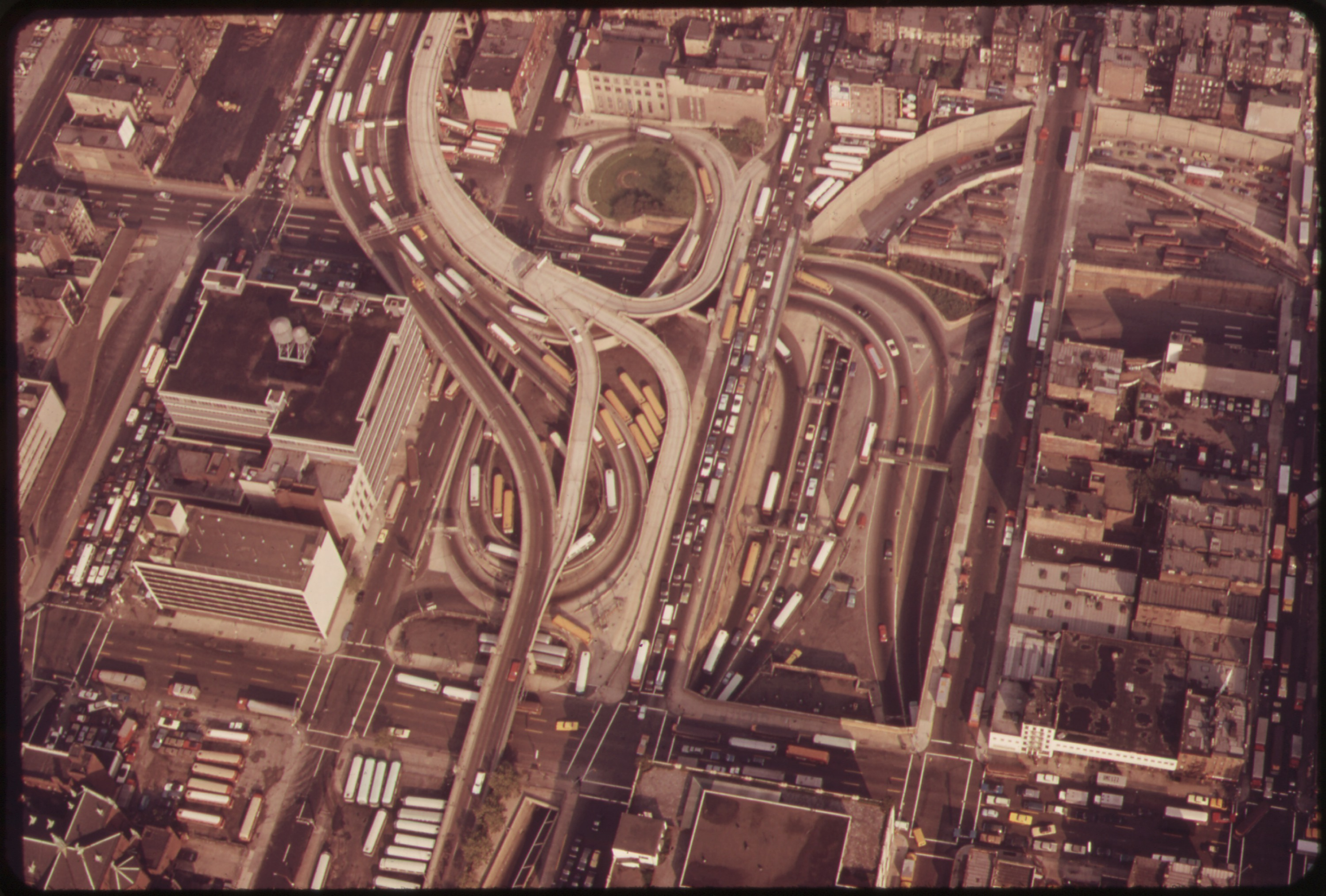
Aerial view of the Manhattan approaches in 1973

As traffic increased through the tubes, the Port Authority tried various methods to mitigate tunnel congestion. In February 1957, it started training "spotters" to look at traffic on the Manhattan side's tunnel approaches from the 35th floor of 330 West 42nd Street, located nearby. The Port Authority started using two-way radios in mid-1958.

In 1966–1967, the Port Authority installed closed-circuit television systems to monitor and control the spacing of traffic in the Lincoln and Holland Tunnels. Port Authority officers observed Lincoln Tunnel traffic from a control center on the New Jersey side. Patrolmen were stationed within each tube to watch out for stalled vehicles, and a computerized system also monitored traffic flows in each tube.

Originally, the northern and center tubes were paved using bricks, while the southern tube contained an asphalt surface. The brick road surfaces began to deteriorate over time, and in 1967–1968, the northern and center tubes were paved over with asphalt. By 1971, Lincoln Tunnel was carrying 32 million vehicles per year. From the Lincoln Tunnel's opening until 1970, the Port Authority charged the same flat-rate toll of 50 cents in each direction. Westbound tolls were removed in 1970, and the tolls for eastbound drivers were doubled to offset the loss of the westbound tolls.

In December 1970, the Port Authority tested out an exclusive bus lane for one year, and it became so popular that the bus lane was later made permanent. In 1971, the elephants of the Ringling Bros. and Barnum & Bailey Circus walked through the Lincoln Tunnel. The animals were normally taken via railroad, but a labor strike had suspended all rail service to Madison Square Garden. The elephants started walking through the Queens–Midtown Tunnel instead of the Lincoln Tunnel starting in 1981, and the elephant walk ceased altogether when the elephants were retired in 2016.

The Port Authority started repaving the Lincoln Tunnel's center tube in the early 1980s, in preparation for a renovation of the Holland Tunnel that was slated to start in 1984. Due to the renovation project, the Holland Tunnel's tubes would be closed one at a time for two and a half years, and traffic would be diverted to the Lincoln Tunnel. After the Holland Tunnel renovation was done, the Lincoln Tunnel's north and south tubes would be repaved. Each repaving was set to cost $10 million. The repair work on the Lincoln Tunnel's center tube cost $2 million more than projected, and took five times as long as initially estimated, because repaving only occurred at night. In 1989, during the rehabilitation and repaving of the northern tube, a computerized traffic-control center was built in the administration building on the New Jersey side, which allowed a tunnel controller inside the building to remotely control the flow of traffic to, from, and through Lincoln Tunnel. The computerized system was connected to 73 cameras that captured video of the entirety of the three tubes. Cellphone service was added to the tubes in 1995 as part of a $1.2 million project funded by the telecommunications company Cellular One. A major overhaul of the center tube started in 1996 at a cost of $53 million. This construction included replacing tiles, wire ducts, curbs, doors, and other infrastructure. The same year, the Port Authority board also voted to renovate the toll plaza for $42 million.

In the immediate aftermath of the September 11 attacks in 2001, the tunnel was closed to all traffic until 3:00 a.m. on September 13. For several months afterward, drivers with no passengers were banned from going through the Lincoln Tunnel during weekday mornings, due to traffic gridlock that resulted from the collapse of the World Trade Center. This ban was partially repealed in April 2002. The tunnels portals were revamped in 2004. In 2014, the lighting in the tunnels were replaced by new energy efficient LED diodes.

=== Crime and terrorism ===
On September 8, 1953, two armed men attempted to rob a home in South Orange, New Jersey, when they were chased off by residents, one of whom reported their car's license plate number. A patrolman at the Lincoln Tunnel's tollbooth tried to stop the car, but the robbers shot at police, hitting a Port Authority policeman in the leg. The police commandeered a delivery truck and gave chase, exchanging 28 shots with the fleeing car while weaving in and out of traffic. The vehicle came to a stop about three-quarters of the way through the tunnel, after one of the robbers had been shot in the head. The delivery truck driver was later honored for his role in chasing the attempted robbers, and the patrolmen involved were also honored.

The Lincoln Tunnel was used several times more by criminal suspects trying to escape the police. In 1956, a motorist, whose car had been taken by police, stole his own car in Manhattan, then sped through the Lincoln Tunnel and opened fire on pursuing police before being stopped on the George Washington Bridge. In 1967, two bank robbery suspects were traveling through the tunnel when they were enclosed on either end by police.

Due to its status as one of the few connections between Manhattan and New Jersey, the Lincoln Tunnel is considered to be one of the most high-risk terrorist target sites in the United States. Other such sites in New Jersey include the Holland Tunnel and the PATH station at Exchange Place, both of which are in Jersey City, as well as the Port of Newark in Elizabeth. In 1995, ten men were convicted of a bombing plot in which a radical Islamic group plotted to blow up five or six sites in New York City, including the Holland and Lincoln Tunnels and the George Washington Bridge.

== Route numbering ==
New York State Route 495
- Location: Manhattan
- Length: 1.09 mi (1.75 km)
- Existed: 1958

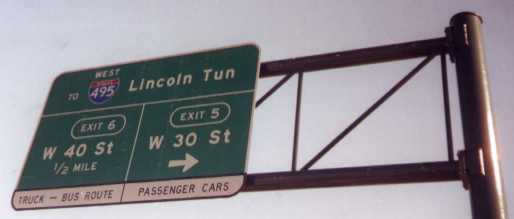
Old "I-495 Lincoln Tunnel" sign, still in situ along the West Side Highway

Originally, the Lincoln Tunnel would have connected to the Queens-Midtown Tunnel, on the other side of Manhattan, via the Mid-Manhattan Expressway. Manhattan Borough President Samuel Levy first proposed the Mid-Manhattan Expressway connector in 1936. Updated plans for the crosstown highway were released in 1944 and featured a connection to the then-proposed Port Authority Bus Terminal. The plans were eventually changed to a crosstown tunnel across 30th Street, and the city approved a preliminary survey for the crosstown tunnel. The city briefly held up plans for the Lincoln Tunnel's southernmost tube in 1951 and 1952 because it wanted the Port Authority to build part of the expressway, although this requirement was later dropped. The Interstate 495 (I-495) designation was assigned to the New Jersey approach to the tunnel in anticipation of the Mid-Manhattan Expressway being completed.

The Mid-Manhattan Expressway project was ultimately canceled and the I-495 designation removed from the expressway on January 1, 1970. However, the I-495 designation in New Jersey remained for some time, as it was anticipated that it would remain part of the Interstate Highway System. Much of the New Jersey stretch of I-495 became Route 495 in 1979. The Westway project, proposed in 1971, called for building an I-478 to link I-278 in Brooklyn, I-78 at the Holland Tunnel, and I-495 at the Lincoln Tunnel. The Westway project was officially abandoned in 1985 after a series of lawsuits from environmental advocates. The last part of I-495 in New Jersey was decommissioned the next year, and the Lincoln Tunnel was thus removed from the Interstate system. In Manhattan, 34th Street and other crosstown streets link the tunnel with I-495.

As of 2018, the part of the tunnel within New Jersey carries Route 495. It is disputed whether the part of the tunnel within New York contains the unsigned New York State Route 495 (NY 495). A 2016 highway inventory listing from the New York State Department of Transportation (NYSDOT) considers NY 495 to be 1.09 miles (1.75 km) long, running through the tunnel, from the New Jersey State Line east to the intersection of Dyer Avenue and 34th Street. However, the NYSDOT also published two "official descriptions of highway touring routes" in 2004 and 2017, in which it did not consider the Lincoln Tunnel within New York to be part of NY 495. According to these documents, the NY 495 designation instead applies to part of the Long Island Expressway (I-495) in Queens, and the Lincoln Tunnel does not have an official route designation.

== Tolls ==
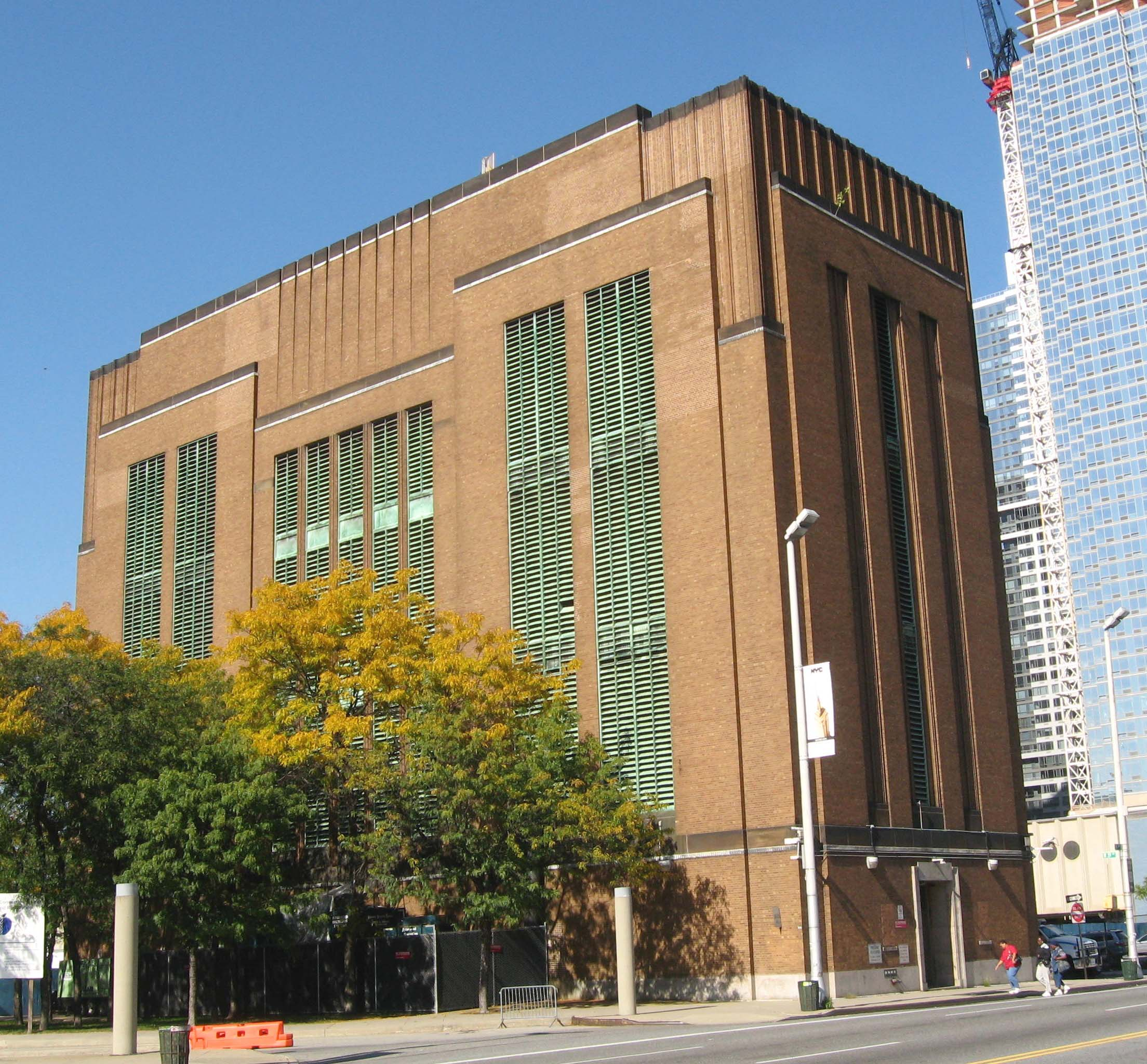
Manhattan ventilation tower

As of January 4, 2026, the toll going from New Jersey to New York City is $23.30 for cars and motorcycles with toll-by-plate or E-ZPasses issued by agencies outside of New York and New Jersey. New Jersey and New York–issued E-ZPass users are charged $14.79 for cars and $13.79 for motorcycles during off-peak hours, and $16.79 for cars and $15.79 for motorcycles during peak hours. E-ZPass Mid-Tier users are charged $19.55 for cars and $19.05 for motorcycles. There is no toll for passenger vehicles going from New York City to New Jersey.

Tolls were formerly collected at a tollbooth on the New Jersey side. Originally, tolls were collected in both directions. In August 1970, the Lincoln Tunnel's 50-cent toll, which the Port Authority had charged since the tunnel's 1937 opening, was abolished for westbound drivers. At the same time, eastbound drivers saw their tolls doubled to $1.00. The tolls of eleven other New York–New Jersey and Hudson River crossings along a 130-mile (210 km) stretch, from the Outerbridge Crossing in the south to the Rip Van Winkle Bridge in the north, were also changed to south- or eastbound-only at that time. The westbound tollbooths were later removed. By 1981, there were 14 eastbound toll lanes, in comparison to the 18 lanes in both directions that the plaza had contained in 1955. As of 2018, there are 13 lanes at the tollbooth. Electronic tolling was first implemented at Lincoln Tunnel circa 1988, when buses were allowed to pay tolls electronically. In 1996, the Port Authority voted to renovate the toll plaza; the proposed improvements included converting it to accommodate electronic tolling for all vehicles that used E-ZPass. E-ZPass toll collection at the Lincoln Tunnel started in October 1997, although the tollbooths were retained.

In March 2020, due to the COVID-19 pandemic, all-electronic tolling was temporarily placed in effect for all Port Authority crossings, including the Lincoln Tunnel. Cash toll collection was temporarily reinstated from October 2020 to December 2022 while infrastructure to convert the tunnel to open road tolling was installed. Open road tolling began on December 11, 2022. The tollbooths were dismantled and replaced by overhead gantries at the Dyer Plaza Ramp upon exiting the tunnel on the Manhattan side. For vehicles without E-ZPass, pictures are taken of the vehicle's license plate and a bill is mailed to the registered owner. For E-ZPass users, sensors detect their transponders wirelessly. The carpool discount was eliminated when open-road tolling was implemented, as the discount required a manual count of passengers. The Lincoln Tunnel had been the last PANYNJ facility to accept cash.

=== Historical toll rates ===
Historical tolls for the Lincoln Tunnel (Note: This table lists the peak tolls for two-axle vehicles. Motorcycle tolls and off-peak tolls are lower, and tolls for vehicles with additional axles are higher.)
Years	Toll		Toll equivalent in 2025		Direction collected	Ref.
Years	Cash	E-ZPass	Cash	E-ZPass		
1937–1970	$0.50	—N/a	$11.20–4.15	—N/a	each direction	
1970–1975	$1.00	—N/a	$8.29–5.98	—N/a	eastbound only	
1975–1983	$1.50	—N/a	$8.97–5.86	—N/a	eastbound only	
1983–1987	$2.00	—N/a	$7.82–5.67	—N/a	eastbound only	
1987–1991	$3.00	—N/a	$8.50–7.09	—N/a	eastbound only	
1991–2001	$4.00	$4.00	$9.46–7.27	$9.46–7.27	eastbound only	
2001–2008	$6.00	$5.00	$10.91–8.97	$9.09–7.48	eastbound only	
2008–2011	$8.00	$8.00	$11.96–11.45	$11.96–11.45	eastbound only	
2011–2012	$12.00	$9.50	$17.17–16.83	$13.60–13.32	eastbound only	
2012–2014	$13.00	$10.25	$18.23–17.68	$14.37–13.94	eastbound only	
2014–2015	$14.00	$11.75	$19.04–19.02	$16.82–15.96	eastbound only	
2015–2020	$15.00	$12.50	$20.37–18.66	$16.77–15.55	eastbound only	
2020–2023	$16.00	$13.75	$19.90–17.60	$17.11–14.53	eastbound only	
2023–2024	$17.00	$14.75	$17.96–17.45	$15.59–15.14	eastbound only	
2024–2025	$17.63	$15.38	$17.63	$15.38	eastbound only	
January–July 2025	$18.31	$16.06	$18.31	$16.06	eastbound only	
July 2025 – January 2026	$22.38	$16.06	$22.38	$16.06	eastbound only	
Since January 2026	$23.30	$16.79	$23.30	$16.79	eastbound only	

=== Congestion toll ===
Congestion pricing in New York City was implemented in January 2025; drivers who enter Manhattan via the tunnel pay a second toll. The congestion charges are collected via E-ZPass and tolls-by-mail. The charges vary based on time of day and vehicle class, but the congestion toll is charged once per day. Drivers who use the Lincoln Tunnel to enter the congestion zone receive a $3.00 credit toward the congestion charge during the day, and pay a discounted toll at night.

== See also ==
- Transportation in New York City
- List of fixed crossings of the Hudson River
- List of tunnels documented by the Historic American Engineering Record in New York
