= Kilenyi =

Kilenyi is a Hungarian surname. Notable people with the surname include:

- Edward Kilenyi Jr. (1910–2000), American pianist
- Julio Kilenyi (1885–1959), Hungary-born American sculptor and medallic artist
