= Dyer Avenue =

Street in Manhattan, New York

Coordinates: 40°45′19.54″N 73°59′47.35″W

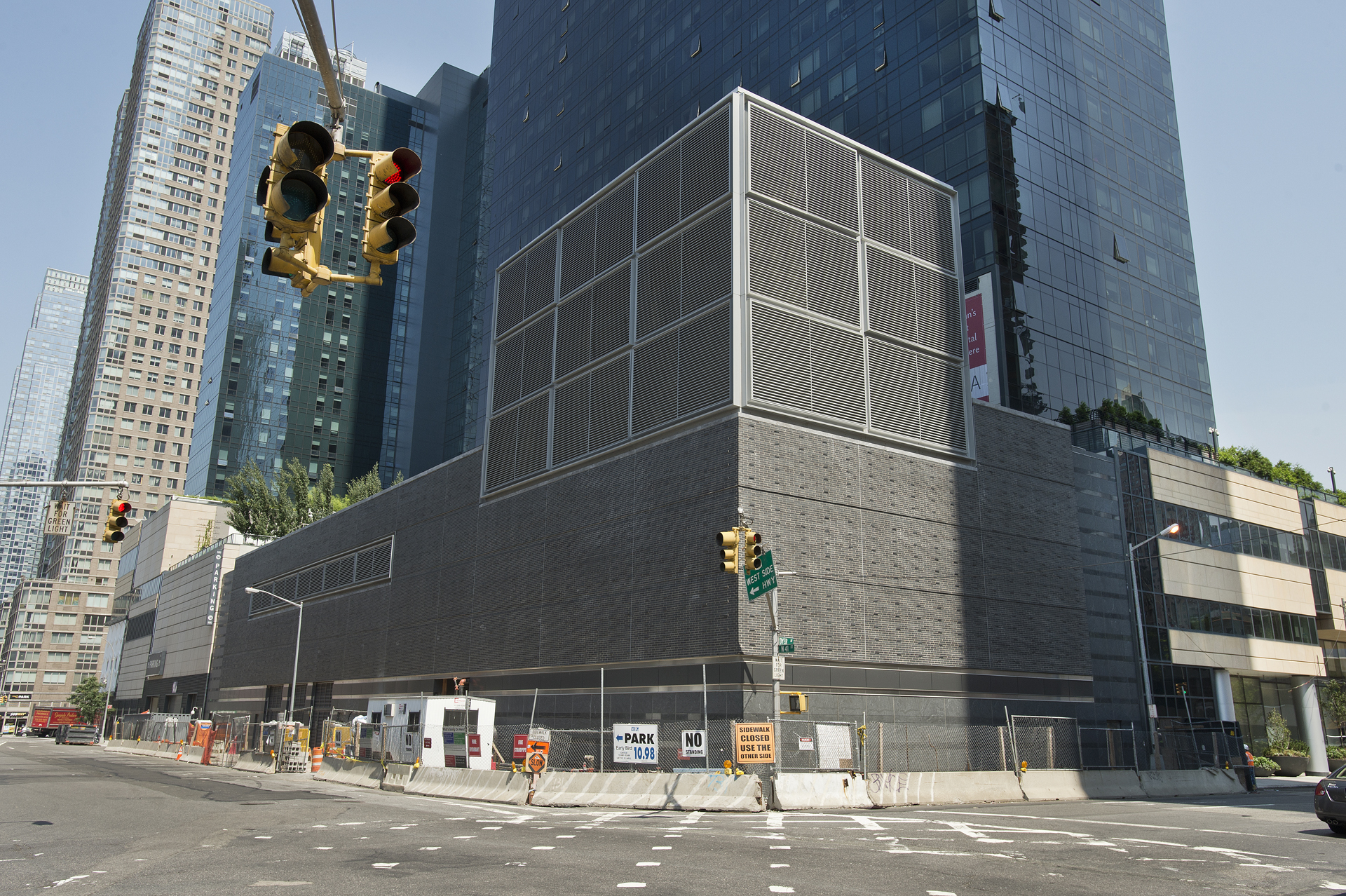
Dyer Avenue at 41st Street; the gray brick building in the center is for the 7 Subway Extension

Dyer Avenue is a short, north–south thoroughfare in the Hell's Kitchen neighborhood of Manhattan in New York City, located between Ninth Avenue and Tenth Avenue. It is primarily used by traffic exiting the Lincoln Tunnel. Dyer Avenue runs between 30th Street and 42nd Street but functions as three distinct sections due to its connections with the south and center tubes of the Lincoln Tunnel. The southernmost section, between 30th and 31st Streets, leads to and from the Lincoln Tunnel Expressway, and is overlaid by the Timber Bridge of the High Line elevated park. Dyer Avenue also exists between 34th and 36th Streets, and between 40th and 42nd Streets; both sections lead directly from the tunnel, but the 34th–36th Streets section also contains a roadway leading to the tunnel. The avenue is owned by the Port Authority of New York and New Jersey.

== Description ==
Dyer Avenue runs between Ninth and Tenth Avenues and exists in three sections, located between 30th–31st Streets, 34th–36th Streets, and 40th–42nd Streets in south-to-north order. The Lincoln Tunnel's southernmost tube, which carries eastbound traffic to New York, surfaces just northeast of the intersection of 38th Street and Tenth Avenue. It leads directly to both the central and southern legs of Dyer Avenue. The center tube, which is reversible, ascends to ground level just southeast of 39th Street and Tenth Avenue, parallel to the southernmost tube. The center tube funnels directly into the southbound Lincoln Tunnel Expressway, but an exit ramp also leads to the central and southern legs of Dyer Avenue. The northern tube, carrying westbound traffic to New Jersey, does not connect directly from Dyer Avenue, but can be accessed via ramps from the Lincoln Tunnel Expressway.

Vehicles exiting the south tube of the Lincoln Tunnel can exit directly onto the central section of Dyer Avenue, between 36th and 34th Streets. Traffic exiting the center tube may also access Dyer Avenue by using an exit ramp from the Lincoln Tunnel Expressway that merges with Dyer Avenue before its intersection with West 36th Street. At this intersection, there is also a southbound entrance ramp to the Lincoln Tunnel Expressway and to the southern section of Dyer Avenue. This ramp permits traffic from the south tube of the tunnel to access the expressway; however, the amount of traffic using this entrance ramp is relatively low because the Lincoln Tunnel Expressway ends a few blocks to the south at West 30th Street and was never connected to the proposed Mid-Manhattan Expressway.

Drivers entering the tunnel can travel northbound on Dyer Avenue for a brief segment between 34th and 36th Streets. At 36th Street, northbound Dyer Avenue merges with a ramp from southbound Ninth Avenue that continues to the Lincoln Tunnel Expressway and provides access to the center and north tubes of the Lincoln Tunnel. A ramp leading from the southern section of Dyer Avenue leads to the northbound Lincoln Tunnel Expressway, which continues directly into the northern tube.

North of West 39th Street, Dyer Avenue is used by northbound vehicles exiting the south and center tubes of the Lincoln Tunnel. Before the intersection with West 40th Street, there are direct ramps leading up to the Port Authority Bus Terminal that are used by buses (to the upper levels of the terminal's north and south wings) and cars (to the parking garage above the south wing of the terminal). Another large parking garage is located on West 42nd Street, opposite the end of Dyer Avenue. Squeegee men used to target motorists stopped at traffic signals in this area. The northern section of Dyer Avenue previously had a contraflow lane for buses to access the center tube of the Lincoln Tunnel during the evening rush hour on weekdays.

== History ==
Dyer Avenue is named after General George Rathbone Dyer, who was the chairman of the board of the Port Authority of New York and New Jersey and died while the Lincoln Tunnel was under construction. A number of buildings in the Hell's Kitchen neighborhood were demolished in order to construct the 75-foot-wide (23 m) right-of-way of the new avenue and provide access to the Lincoln Tunnel, of which the first (now the center) tube opened in December 1937.

In 2003, as part of the Hudson Yards Redevelopment Project, the New York City Department of City Planning issued a master plan that envisioned the creation of a network of open space between Ninth Avenue and Tenth Avenue to create a park system from West 39th Street to West 34th Street, portions of which would be located along Dyer Avenue.
