= Lincoln Tunnel Expressway =

Depressed freeway in Midtown Manhattan, New York, US

- Map highlighting New York section of Lincoln Tunnel, Lincoln Tunnel Expressway and extension onto West 31st Street

Route information
- Length: 0.8 mi (1,300 m)
- Component highways: NY 495 (unsigned)

Major junctions
- South end: West 31st Street in Hudson Yards
- North end: NY 495 in Hell's Kitchen

Location
- Country: United States
- State: New York

Highway system
- New York Highways; Interstate; US; State; Reference; Parkways

The Lincoln Tunnel Expressway is an eight block-long, mostly four-lane, north–south freeway between the portals of the Lincoln Tunnel and West 31st Street in Midtown Manhattan in New York City. Dyer Avenue is an at-grade roadway paralleling part of the mostly depressed roadway and serves traffic entering and leaving the expressway and the tubes of the tunnel. Like the tunnel, the roads are owned and operated by the Port Authority of New York and New Jersey. They traverse the Manhattan neighborhoods of Hell's Kitchen and Chelsea between Ninth and Tenth avenues. The expressway serves as the entrance to the Lincoln Tunnel from Manhattan, with the entrance from Weehawken, New Jersey being the Lincoln Tunnel Helix (New Jersey Route 495).

== Route description ==
The Lincoln Tunnel Expressway runs for eight blocks within the Manhattan neighborhoods of Hell's Kitchen and Chelsea, between Ninth Avenue to the east and Tenth Avenue to the west, connecting to the Lincoln Tunnel to New Jersey at its northern end. The southern terminus of the expressway is located at West 30th Street, midblock between Ninth and Tenth Avenues. The block of 30th Street between these two avenues is a six-lane divided street: the southern roadway hosts eastbound local traffic, while the northern roadway funnels northbound traffic from Tenth Avenue east onto the northbound expressway, and southbound traffic from Ninth Avenue west onto the southbound expressway.

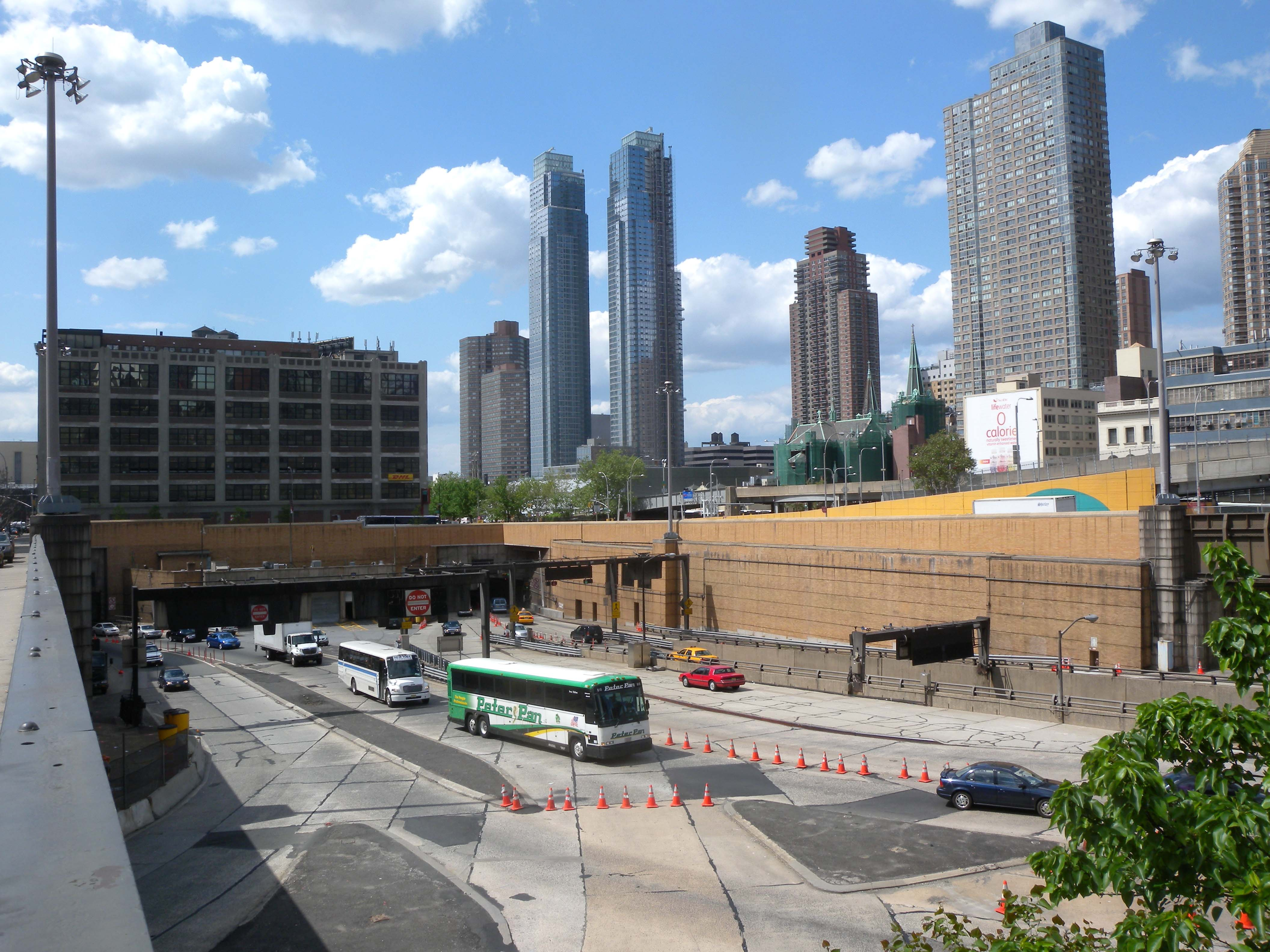
The expressway meets the portals of the south and center tubes of the Lincoln Tunnel

The expressway then continues north as Dyer Avenue, a divided four-lane street, for one block. At 31st Street, there is a traffic light, and the highway continues north underneath the Manhattan West development and local streets as a grade-separated highway. The expressway passes under 33rd Street, where an entrance and exit ramp to and from the Lincoln Tunnel descends from 33rd Street to the median of the below-grade highway, merging with the respective directions of traffic. The Lincoln Tunnel Expressway passes under local streets for three more blocks. At 36th Streets ramps lead to and from the southbound expressway, while a ramp from northbound Dyer Avenue and southbound Ninth Avenue merges into the northbound expressway.

The Lincoln Tunnel Expressway passes under 37th Street and then curves west. The northbound roadway splits into two ramps: one leading to the normally-bidirectional center tube, the other leading to a short tunnel that connects to the westbound-only northern tube. The bidirectional roadway can be closed to either direction of traffic if the center tube is operating in one direction, although southbound highway traffic would be completely cut off when the center tube operates westbound to New Jersey. The highway dips under a ramp to northbound Dyre Avenue, which splits from both the eastbound-only southern tube and the eastbound lane of the center tube just west of this overpass. A ramp from the Port Authority Bus Terminal merges with the westbound highway at this point. The highway then connects to the western tube of the tunnel just east of Tenth Avenue.

== History ==
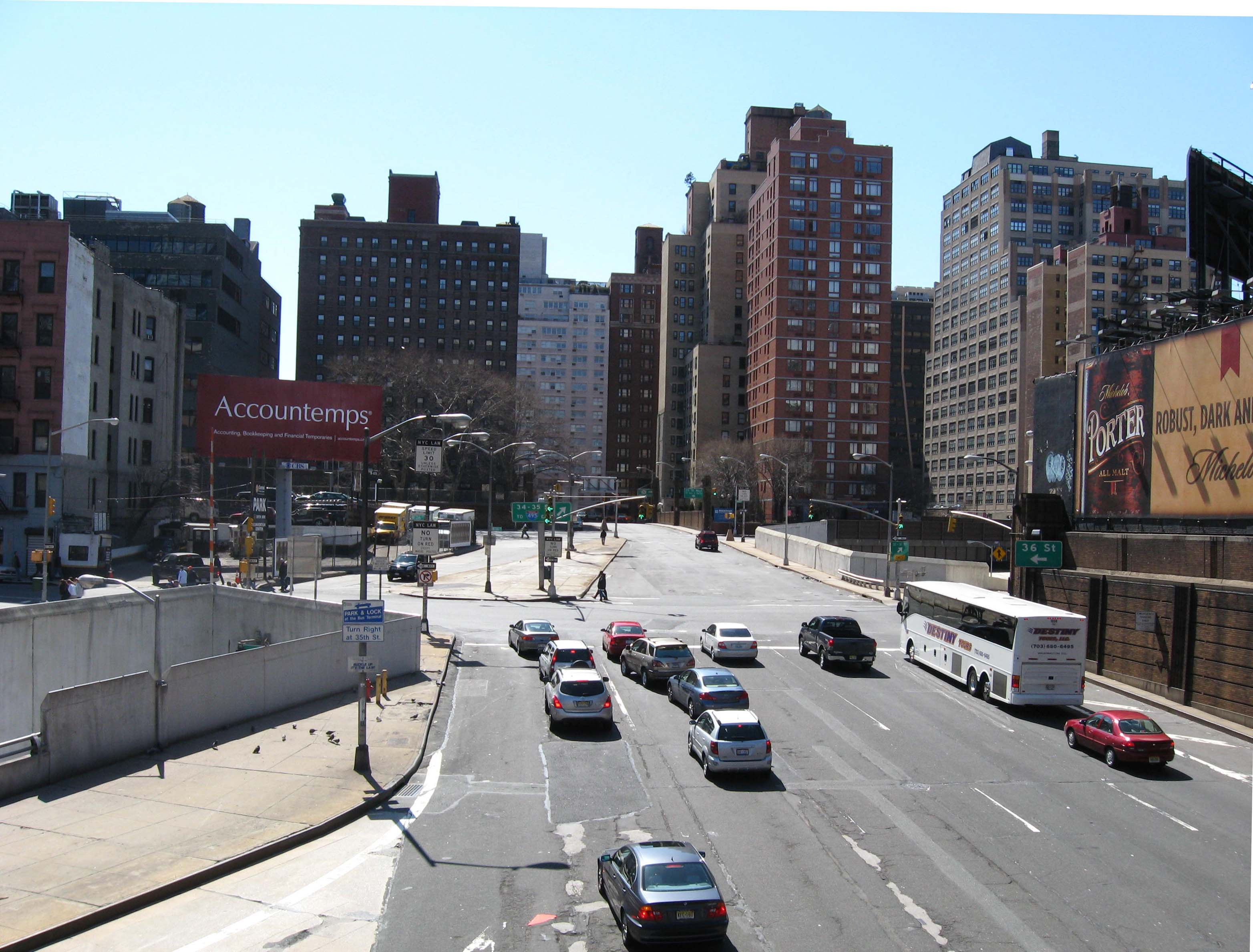
Dyer Avenue at 36th Street crossing over the Lincoln Tunnel Expressway

=== Need ===
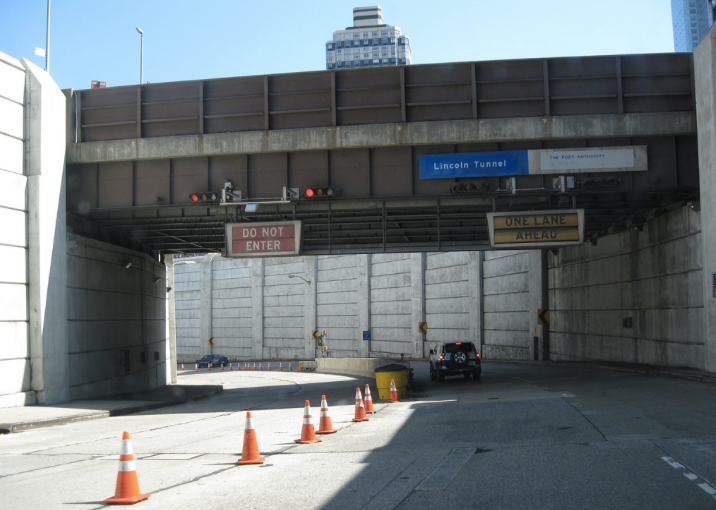
The north-south roadway passing under crosstown streets in open cuts and tunnels

In 1934, a number of buildings in the neighborhood were demolished to construct the 75-foot-wide (23 m) right-of-way of Dyer Avenue, an arterial street providing access to the then-under-construction Lincoln Tunnel. Dyer Avenue was named after General George Rathborne Dyer, who was the chairman of the board of the Port Authority and died while the tunnel was under construction. The tunnel's first (now center) tube opened in December 1937. A second tube opened to the north in 1945, but the tunnels only had a combined capacity of 15 million vehicles per year, and by 1949, the tubes were already carrying 11 million annual vehicles.

In March 1951, the Port Authority commissioners gave their approval to preliminary plans for a third tube of the Lincoln Tunnel, to the south of the two existing tubes. The project would also involve extending the Dyer Avenue approach, on the Manhattan side, southward from 34th Street to 31st Street. It included the approach roads in Manhattan and Hudson County, New Jersey, as outlined in the Joint Study of Arterial Facilities which had been commissioned by the agency and the Triborough Bridge Authority. The tube was completed in May 1957 at a cost of $85 million.

=== Construction ===
The Lincoln Tunnel Expressway was first conceived during the planning process for the tunnel's third tube. The city of New York had had concerns that existing streets could not adequately handle the extra traffic from the third tube. After fifteen months of negotiation, the city and the Port Authority came to an agreement in June 1952. The agency agreed to widen 30th Street between 10th Avenue and 12th Avenue, and to provide ramps between the tunnel and the West Side Highway. This included the construction of the Lincoln Tunnel Expressway between 31st Street and the tunnel entrance at 38th Street.

The expressway was opened on February 19, 1957, just before the opening of the third tube, at a cost of $11 million. At the highway's opening, it was described as a "triumph of engineering skill". The New York Times stated, "In constructing the approach highway, engineers had to build a bridge under an existing bridge, provide two twin tunnels and five viaducts, depress the roadbed in part, elevate it at other places, and develop an intricate network of entrance and exit ramps at intermediate points." As part of the highway design, ramps were constructed to the Port Authority Bus Terminal. Pamphlets were issued to motorists at the highway opening.

=== Mid-Manhattan Expressway and I-495 designation ===
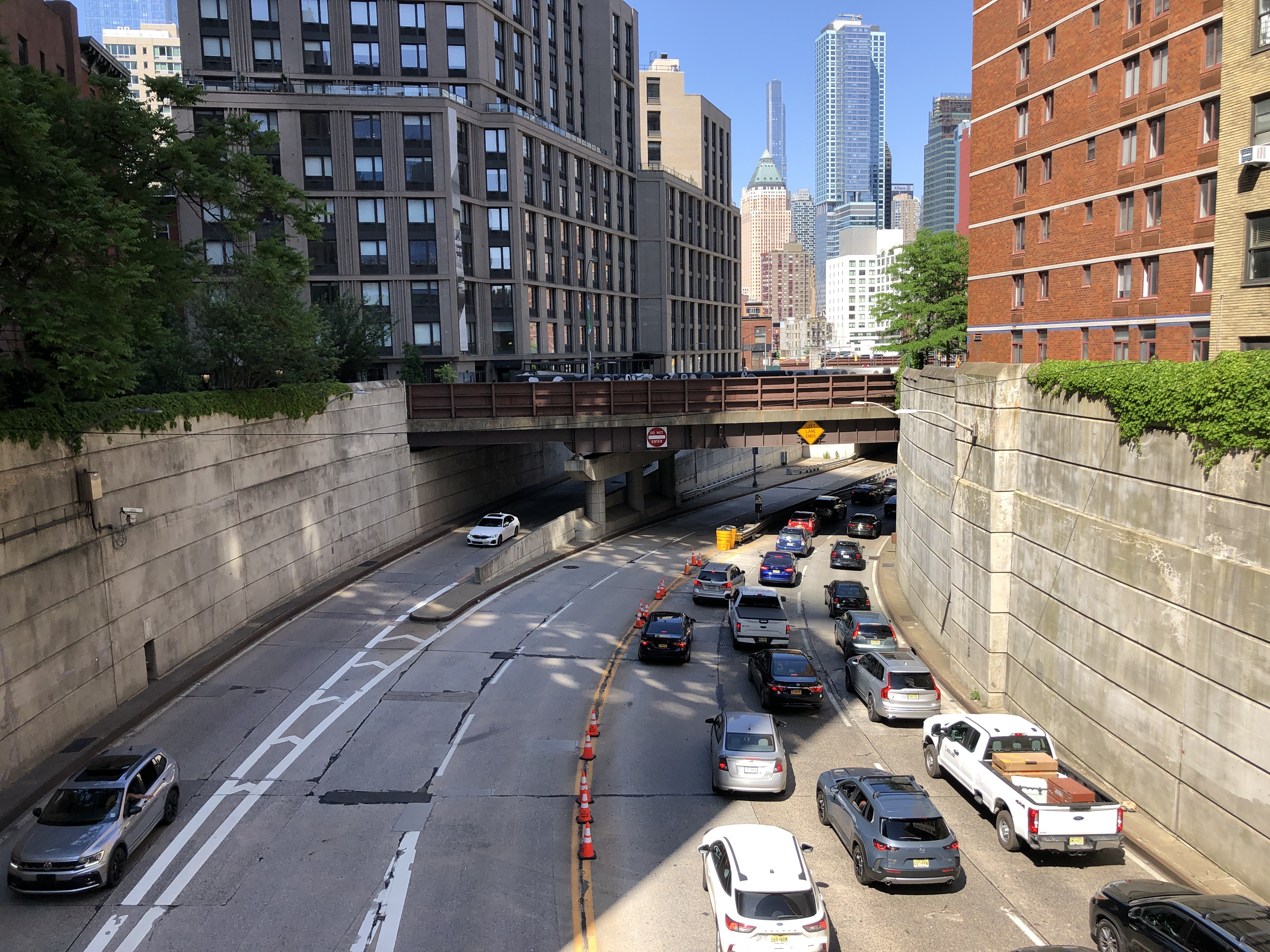
The expressway heading toward the tunnel as seen from West 34th Street

The Lincoln Tunnel Expressway is designated the unsigned NY 495. The highway was to be integrated into the unbuilt Mid-Manhattan Expressway, a crosstown route leading to the Queens-Midtown Tunnel, now part of Interstate 495, and be designated I-495. The I-495 designation was assigned to the New Jersey approach to the tunnel in 1958 in anticipation of the Mid-Manhattan Expressway being completed. That crosstown project was later canceled and was officially removed from I-495 on January 1, 1970. The New Jersey stretch of I-495 became New Jersey Route 495 in 1979. The I-495 designation was removed from the Lincoln Tunnel In 1989.

== Open space and air rights ==
The area around the Lincoln Tunnel Expressway-Dyer Avenue corridor has been rezoned for commercial and residential development as part of the Hudson Yards Redevelopment Project and the construction of the 7 Subway Extension. The 2003 the New York City Department of City Planning issued a master plan that calls for the creation of a network of open space between Ninth Avenue and Tenth Avenue to create a park system from West 39th Street to West 34th Street.

As of 2014, the PANYNJ owned about 19 acres (7.7 ha) of property in Midtown West, mostly between 31st and 41st streets and 9th and 10th avenues, much it dedicated to transportation. In addition to owning the roadways the PANYNJ also owns adjacent parcels along the right-of-way and is actively attempting to divest itself of the property acquired during original construction or for development of the canceled ARC Tunnel. Funds would be used for the redevelopment of the Port Authority Bus Terminal and other infrastructure improvements.

In 2011, the city approved construction of two 18 stories building at 9th Avenue between 37th and 38th streets. In April 2012, the PANYNJ reported that a proposal had been made by developer Larry Silverstein, who has a memorandum of understanding to develop this property at 39th Street to construct a bus garage with a residential tower above it. The parcel is not large enough to accommodate bus ramps and would require the use of elevators, a new type of application for bus storage. In September 2014, Extell Development Company purchased air rights for $30 million for a parcel between 36-37th streets. A platform or a cantilever structure over the highway could be built. While approved by the PANYNJ the sale of parcels at 30th Street to the McDermont Company for a 500,000-square-foot residential tower the plans were dropped. and the land was put back on the market.

== Exit list ==
The entire route is in the New York City borough of Manhattan. All exits are unnumbered.

Location	mi	km	Destinations	Notes
Hudson Yards	0.00	0.00	West 31st Street NY 495 begins	Southern terminus; at-grade intersection; eastern terminus of NY 495
Hudson Yards	0.2	0.32	West 33rd Street west	Southbound exit and northbound entrance
Hell's Kitchen	0.3	0.48	34th–36th Streets to I-495 Toll east (Queens–Midtown Tunnel) – Downtown, Madison Square Garden	Southbound exit and northbound entrance; access via Dyer Avenue south
Hell's Kitchen	0.4	0.64	Ninth Avenue	Northbound entrance only
Hell's Kitchen	0.5	0.80	40th–42nd Streets to NY 9A (West Side Highway) – Uptown, Theater District	Southbound exit and northbound entrance; access via Dyer Avenue north
Hell's Kitchen	0.6	0.97	West 39th Street	Exit and entrance from North Tube
Hell's Kitchen	0.7	1.1	West 40th Street / Galvin Avenue – Port Authority Bus Terminal	Northbound entrance to North Tube
Hell's Kitchen	0.8	1.3	NY 495 west (Lincoln Tunnel) – New Jersey	Continuation west; northern end of NY 495 concurrency; former I-495
1.000 mi = 1.609 km; 1.000 km = 0.621 mi: Concurrency terminus; Incomplete access

== See also ==
- Trans-Manhattan Expressway
- Holland Tunnel Rotary
