= Julio Kilenyi =

American sculptor

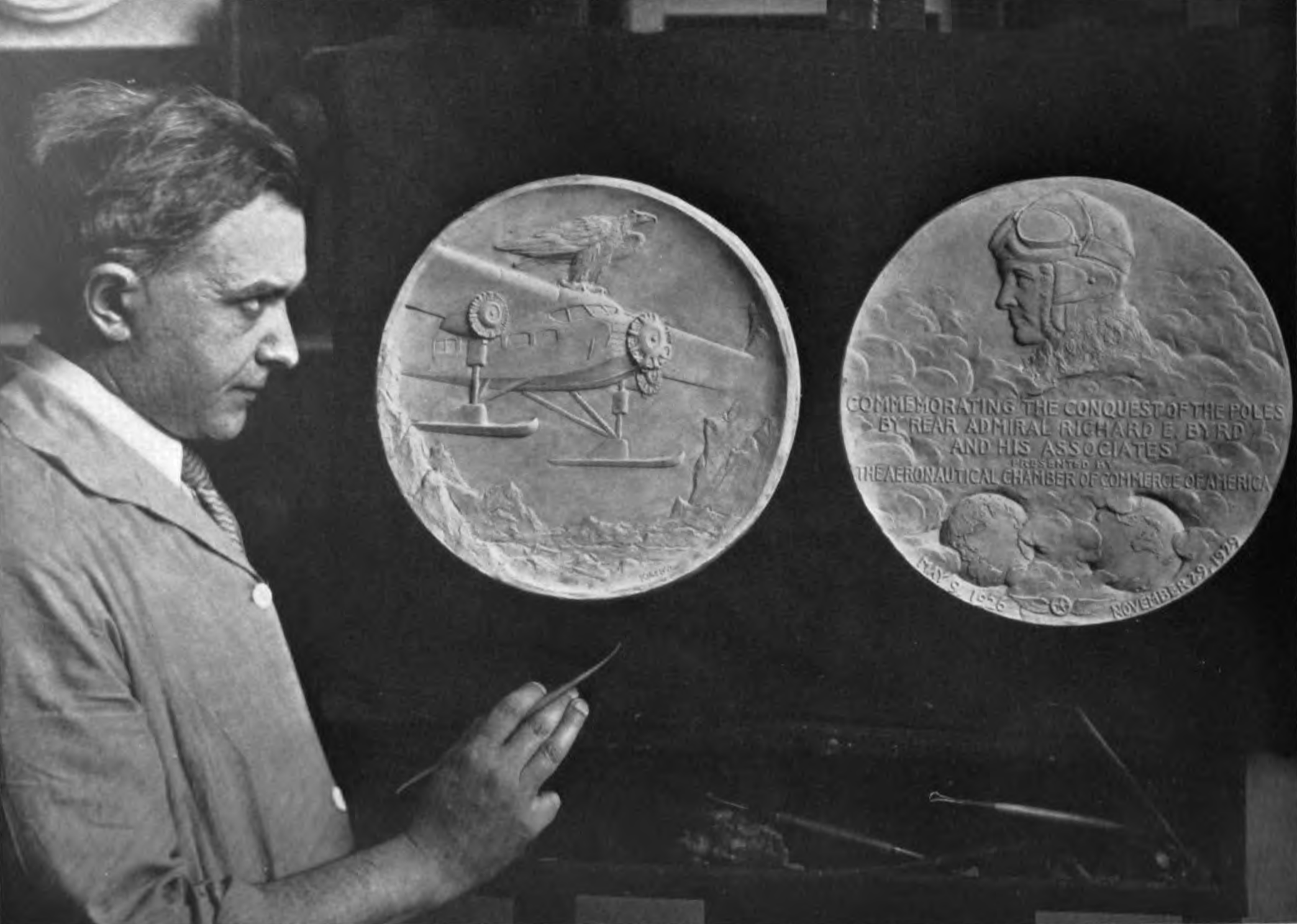
Julio Kilenyi with his design for a commemorative medal

Julio Kilenyi (February 21, 1885 Arad, Kingdom of Hungary (now in Romania) - January 29, 1959) an American sculptor and medallic artist. In 1909, he moved to Buenos Aires, Argentina. Later he moved to New York. He began his career in the U.S. in 1916 and was known primarily as the designer of commemorative medals. His work was part of the sculpture event in the art competition at the 1932 Summer Olympics.
